

Deaths in April

 23: Natalia Lavrova
 21: Juan Antonio Samaranch
 20: Keli McGregor
 10: Arthur Mercante Sr.
 10: Piotr Nurowski
 8: Personal Ensign
 4: Alec Bedser

Current sporting seasons

Australian rules football 2010

Australian Football League

Auto racing 2010

Formula One
Sprint Cup
IRL IndyCar Series
World Rally Championship
Formula Two
Nationwide Series
Camping World Truck Series
WTTC
V8 Supercar
American Le Mans
Le Mans Series
Superleague Formula
Rolex Sports Car Series
FIA GT1 World Championship
Formula Three
Auto GP
World Series by Renault
Deutsche Tourenwagen Masters
Super GT

Baseball 2010

Major League Baseball
Nippon Professional Baseball

Basketball 2010

NBA
Euroleague
EuroChallenge
France
Germany
Greece
Israel
Italy
Philippines
Fiesta Conference
Spain
Turkey

Cricket 2009–2010

Bangladesh:
National League
England:
County Championship
India:
Ranji Trophy
New Zealand:
Plunket Shield
Pakistan:
Quaid-i-Azam Trophy
South Africa:
SuperSport Series
Sri Lanka:
Premier Trophy
Zimbabwe:
Logan Cup

Darts

Premier League

Football (soccer) 2010

National teams competitions
2011 FIFA Women's World Cup qualification (UEFA)
2011 UEFA European Under-21 Championship qualification
International clubs competitions
UEFA (Europe) Champions League
Europa League
UEFA Women's Champions League
Copa Libertadores (South America)
AFC (Asia) Champions League
AFC Cup
CAF (Africa) Champions League
CAF Confederation Cup
OFC (Oceania) Champions League
Domestic (national) competitions
Argentina
England
France
Germany
Iran
Italy
Japan
Norway
Russia
Scotland
Spain
Major League Soccer (USA & Canada)
Women's Professional Soccer (USA)

Golf 2010

PGA Tour
European Tour
LPGA Tour
Champions Tour

Ice hockey 2010

National Hockey League
Canadian Hockey League:
OHL, QMJHL, WHL

Motorcycle racing 2010

Moto GP
Superbike World Championship
Supersport racing

Rugby league 2010

Super League
NRL

Rugby union 2010

2011 Rugby World Cup qualifying
Heineken Cup
European Challenge Cup
English Premiership
Celtic League
Top 14
Super 14
Sevens World Series

Days of the month

April 30, 2010 (Friday)

Auto racing
Nationwide Series:
BUBBA burger 250 in Richmond, Virginia:
(1)  Brad Keselowski (Dodge, Penske Racing) (2)  Greg Biffle (Ford, Baker-Curb Racing) (3)  Jamie McMurray (Chevrolet, JR Motorsports)
Drivers' championship standings (after 9 of 35 races): (1) Keselowski 1469 points (2)  Kevin Harvick (Chevrolet, Kevin Harvick Incorporated) 1410 (3)  Kyle Busch (Toyota, Joe Gibbs Racing) 1385

Basketball
NBA Playoffs (all series best-of-7):
Western Conference First Round:
Game 6: Los Angeles Lakers 95, Oklahoma City Thunder 94. Lakers win series 4–2.
Game 6: Utah Jazz 112, Denver Nuggets 104. Jazz win series 4–2.
Eastern Conference First Round:
Game 6: Atlanta Hawks 83, Milwaukee Bucks 69. Series tied 3–3.
EuroChallenge Final Four:
Semifinals:
BG Göttingen  77–67  Chorale Roanne Basket
Krasnye Krylya Samara  73–70  Scavolini Spar Pesaro

Chess
World Championship in Sofia, Bulgaria
Game 5: Veselin Topalov  (White) drew with Viswanathan Anand  (Black)
Anand leads the series 3–2.

Cricket
ICC Men's World Twenty20 in West Indies:
Group B:  135/6 (20 overs);  139/8 (19.5 overs) in Guyana. New Zealand win by 2 wickets.
Group D:  138/9 (20.0 overs);  68 all out (16.4 overs) in Guyana. West Indies win by 70 runs.

Cycling
UCI ProTour:
Tour de Romandie:
Stage 3:  Richie Porte  30' 54"  Alejandro Valverde  + 26"  Vladimir Karpets  + 27"
General classification: (1) Michael Rogers   9h 56' 03" (2) Valverde + 2" (3) Karpets + 5"

Equestrianism
Show jumping
FEI Nations Cup Promotional League:
FEI Nations Cup of Belgium in Lummen:   (Denis Lynch on Abberuail van het Dingeshof, Alex Duffy on Tampa, Shane Breen on Carmena Z, Billy Twomey on Tinka's Serenade)   (Chris Chugg on Vivant, Paul Athanasoff on Wirragulla Nicklaus, Phillip Lever on Ashleigh Drossel Dan, James Paterson-Robinson on Niack de L'Abbaye)   (Stein Endresen on Hoyo de Monterey, Geir Gulliksen on L'Espoir, Connie Bull on Cézanne, Morten Djupvik on Casino)

Gymnastics
European Women's Artistic Gymnastics Championships in Birmingham, United Kingdom:
Juniors all round:  Viktoria Komova   Anastasia Grishina   Larisa Iordache

Ice hockey
Stanley Cup playoffs (all series best-of-7):
Eastern Conference Semifinals:
Game 1: (4) Pittsburgh Penguins 6, (8) Montreal Canadiens 3. Penguins lead series 1–0.

Rugby union
2011 Rugby World Cup qualifying:
2010 Asian Five Nations:
Arabian Gulf  16–9  in Manama, Bahrain
Standings: Hong Kong 7 points (2 matches),  6 (1), Arabian Gulf 5 (2),  0 (0),  0 (1).
Amlin Challenge Cup Semi-finals:
Connacht  12–19  Toulon
Toulon's win means that the final will be held at Stade Vélodrome in Marseille.

Snooker
World Championship in Sheffield, England:
Semi-finals (best of 33 frames):
Neil Robertson  leads Ali Carter  15–9
Graeme Dott  leads Mark Selby  10–6

April 29, 2010 (Thursday)

Basketball
NBA Playoffs (all series best-of-7):
Western Conference First Round:
Game 6: San Antonio Spurs 97, Dallas Mavericks 87. Spurs win series 4–2.
Game 6: Phoenix Suns 99, Portland Trail Blazers 90. Suns win series 4–2.
NBA season awards:
Rookie of the Year: Tyreke Evans, Sacramento Kings
 The NCAA board of directors votes to expand the Division I men's tournament from 65 teams to 68, effective with next year's tournament. (AP via ESPN)

Cycling
UCI ProTour:
Tour de Romandie:
Stage 2:  Mark Cavendish  4h 28' 59"  Danilo Hondo  s.t.  Robbie Hunter  s.t.
General classification: (1) Peter Sagan   9h 24' 28" (2) Marco Pinotti  + 9" (3) Jérémy Roy  + 9"

Darts
Premier League round 12 in Aberdeen, Scotland:  (players in bold advance to semifinals, players in strike are eliminated)
Ronnie Baxter  7–7 James Wade 
Mervyn King  1–8 Phil Taylor 
Raymond van Barneveld  8–6 Terry Jenkins 
Barneveld hit the second nine dart finish of the Premier League in the second leg. (T20, T19 and D12)
Simon Whitlock  7–7 Adrian Lewis 
High checkout: Jenkins 146
Standings after 12 rounds: Taylor 22 points, King 13, Wade, Baxter, Whitlock 12, Lewis 10, Jenkins 8, Barneveld 7.

Football (soccer)
UEFA Europa League Semi-finals, second leg: (first leg score in parentheses)
Fulham  2–1 (0–0)  Hamburg. Fulham win 2–1 on aggregate.
Liverpool  2–1 (AET) (0–1)  Atlético Madrid. 2–2 on aggregate, Atlético Madrid win on away goals.
Copa Libertadores Round of 16, first leg:
Once Caldas  0–0  Libertad
Cruzeiro  3–1  Nacional
Alianza Lima  0–1  Universidad de Chile
 Coppa Titano Final in Serravalle:
Tre Penne 1–2 (AET) Tre Fiori
Tre Fiori win their sixth Coppa Titano, and their first since 1985.

Ice hockey
Stanley Cup playoffs (all series best-of-7):
Western Conference Semifinals:
Game 1: (1) San Jose Sharks 4, (5) Detroit Red Wings 3.  Sharks lead series 1–0.

Snooker
World Championship in Sheffield, England:
Semi-finals (best of 33 frames):
Neil Robertson  leads Ali Carter  6–2
Graeme Dott  leads Mark Selby  5–3

April 28, 2010 (Wednesday)

Baseball
 Major League Baseball announces several rules changes for the All-Star Game. The most notable ones are: (AP via ESPN)
 The designated hitter will be used in all games, even in National League ballparks.
 Pitchers who start on the Sunday before the All-Star break will not be allowed to participate in the game, and will be replaced on the roster.

Basketball
NBA Playoffs (all series best-of-7):
Western Conference First Round:
Game 5: Denver Nuggets 116, Utah Jazz 102. Jazz lead series 3–2.
Eastern Conference First Round:
Game 5: Milwaukee Bucks 91, Atlanta Hawks 87. Bucks lead series 3–2.

Chess
World Championship in Sofia, Bulgaria
Game 4: Viswanathan Anand  (White) def. Veselin Topalov  (Black)
Anand leads the series 2½–1½.

Cycling
UCI ProTour:
Tour de Romandie:
Stage 1:  Peter Sagan   4h 50' 21"  Francesco Gavazzi  s.t.  Nicolas Roche  s.t.
General classification: (1) Sagan  4h 55' 29" (2) Marco Pinotti  + 9" (3) Jérémy Roy  + 12"

Football (soccer)
2011 FIFA Women's World Cup qualification (UEFA): (teams in strike are eliminated)
Group 2:  6–0 
Standings: Netherlands 13 points (6 matches), Norway 12 (4), Belarus 7 (4), Slovakia 3 (4), Macedonia 0 (6).
UEFA Champions League Semi-finals, second leg: (first leg score in parentheses)
Barcelona  1–0 (1–3)  Internazionale. Internazionale win 3–2 on aggregate.
Internazionale advance to the final for the fifth time in their history and the first time since 1972.
Copa Libertadores Round of 16, first leg:
Flamengo  1–0  Corinthians
Universitario  0–0  São Paulo
Banfield  3–1  Internacional
AFC Champions League group stage, Round 6: (teams in bold advance to the round of 16)
Group A:
Al-Jazira   2–1  Esteghlal
Al-Ahli  0–1  Al-Gharafa
Final standings: Al-Gharafa 13 points, Esteghlal 11, Al-Ahli 6, Al-Jazira 4.
Group B:
Bunyodkor  4–1  Al-Wahda
Zob Ahan  1–0  Al-Ittihad
Final standings: Zob Ahan 13 points, Bunyodkor 10, Al-Ittihad 8, Al-Wahda 3.
Group E:
Seongnam Ilhwa Chunma  3–2  Melbourne Victory
Beijing Guoan  2–0  Kawasaki Frontale
Final standings: Seongnam Ilhwa Chunma 15 points, Beijing Guoan 10, Kawasaki Frontale 6, Melbourne Victory 4.
Group F:
Persipura Jayapura  2–0  Changchun Yatai
Kashima Antlers  2–1  Jeonbuk Hyundai Motors
Final standings: Kashima Antlers 18 points, Jeonbuk Hyundai Motors 12, Changchun Yatai, Persipura Jayapura 3.
AFC Cup group stage, Round 6: (teams in bold advance to the round of 16)
Group A:
Al-Ahli  2–2  Saham
Al-Karamah  1–1  Shabab Al-Ordon
Final standings: Al-Karamah 14 points, Shabab Al-Ordon 12, Saham 5, Al-Ahli 1.
Group B:
Al-Kuwait  7–1  Churchill Brothers
Final standings: Al-Kuwait 8 points, Churchill Brothers 7,  Al-Hilal 1.
Group E:
Al-Wihdat  0–0  Al-Riffa
Al-Nahda  0–2  Al-Rayyan
Final standings: Al-Rayyan 15 points, Al-Riffa 13, Al-Wihdat 7, Al-Nahda 0.
Group F:
Victory SC  0–5  Bình Dương
Selangor  0–4  Sriwijaya
Final standings: Sriwijaya, Bình Dương 13 points, Selangor, Victory SC 4.
CONCACAF Champions League Final, second leg: (first leg score in parentheses)
Pachuca  1–0 (1–2)  Cruz Azul. 2–2 on aggregate; Pachuca win on away goals.
A goal by Edgar Benítez in the 90th minute gives Pachuca the title for the third time in four seasons, and for the fourth time overall.
UEFA Women's Champions League Semi-finals, second leg: (first leg score in parentheses)
Umeå  0–0 (2–3)  Lyon. Lyon win 3–2 on aggregate.

Ice hockey
Stanley Cup playoffs (all series best-of-7):
Eastern Conference Quarter-finals:
Game 7: (8) Montreal Canadiens 2, (1) Washington Capitals 1. Canadiens win series 4–3.

Snooker
World Championship in Sheffield, England:
Quarter-finals (best of 25 frames):
Graeme Dott  def. Mark Allen  13–12
Neil Robertson  def. Steve Davis  13–5
Mark Selby  def. Ronnie O'Sullivan  13–11
Ali Carter  def. Shaun Murphy  13–12

April 27, 2010 (Tuesday)

Basketball
NBA Playoffs (all series best-of-7):
Western Conference First Round:
Game 5: Los Angeles Lakers 111, Oklahoma City Thunder 87. Lakers lead series 3–2.
Game 5: Dallas Mavericks 103, San Antonio Spurs 81. Spurs lead series 3–2.
Eastern Conference First Round:
Game 5: Cleveland Cavaliers 96, Chicago Bulls 94. Cavaliers win series 4–1.
Game 5: Boston Celtics 96, Miami Heat 86. Celtics win series 4–1.
NBA season awards:
Sixth Man of the Year: Jamal Crawford, Atlanta Hawks

Chess
World Championship in Sofia, Bulgaria
Game 3: Veselin Topalov  (White) drew with Viswanathan Anand  (Black)
Series tied 1½–1½.

Cycling
UCI ProTour:
Tour de Romandie:
Prologue:  Marco Pinotti  5' 17"  Peter Sagan  + 1"  Jérémy Roy  + 3"

Football (soccer)
UEFA Champions League Semi-finals, second leg: (first leg score in parentheses)
Lyon  0–3 (0–1)  Bayern Munich. Bayern Munich win 4–0 on aggregate.
A hat-trick by Ivica Olić puts Bayern Munich in the final for the eighth time in their history and the first since 2001.
Copa Libertadores Round of 16, first leg:
San Luis  0–1  Estudiantes
Guadalajara  3–0  Vélez Sársfield
AFC Champions League group stage, Round 6: (teams in bold advance to the round of 16)
Group C:
Al-Ain  2–0  Sepahan
Al-Shabab  2–1  Pakhtakor
Final standings: Al-Shabab 10 points, Pakhtakor 9, Sepahan 8, Al-Ain 7.
Group D:
Mes Kerman  3–1  Al-Hilal
Al-Sadd  2–2  Al-Ahli
Final standings: Al-Hilal 11 points, Mes Kerman 9, Al-Sadd 8, Al-Ahli 5.
Group G:
Suwon Samsung Bluewings  6–2  Singapore Armed Forces
Henan Construction  1–1  Gamba Osaka
Final standings: Suwon Samsung Bluewings 13 points, Gamba Osaka 12, Singapore Armed Forces 4, Henan Construction 3.
Group H:
Sanfrecce Hiroshima  4–3  Pohang Steelers
Adelaide United  0–1  Shandong Luneng
Final standings: Adelaide United, Pohang Steelers 10 points, Sanfrecce Hiroshima 9, Shandong Luneng 6.
AFC Cup group stage, Round 6: (teams in bold advance to the round of 16)
Group C:
Al-Jaish  1–1  Nasaf Qarshi
Al-Ahed  1–2  Kazma
Final standings: Kazma 13 points, Nasaf Qarshi 11, Al-Jaish 8, Al-Ahed 1.
Group D:
Kingfisher East Bengal  0–4  Al-Nejmeh
Al-Qadsia  3–0  Al-Ittihad
Final standings: Al-Qadsia 14 points, Al-Ittihad, Al-Nejmeh 10, Kingfisher East Bengal 0.
Group G:
Persiwa Wamena  2–2  Muangthong United
South China  3–1  VB Sports Club
Final standings: South China 13 points, Muangthong United 11, VB Sports Club 9, Persiwa Wamena 1.
Group H:
Thai Port  2–0  NT Realty Wofoo Tai Po
Geylang United  1–1  SHB Đà Nẵng
Final standings: SHB Đà Nẵng 14 points, Thai Port 11, Geylang United 4, NT Realty Wofoo Tai Po 2.
 IFA Premiership, matchday 37 of 38:
Linfield 1–0 Cliftonville
Standings: Linfield 74 points, Cliftonville 66, Glentoran 65, Crusaders 60.
Linfield win the championship for the 49th time, and qualify for the Champions League. Cliftonville and Glentoran qualify for the Europa League.

Ice hockey
Stanley Cup playoffs (all series best-of-7):
Western Conference Quarter-finals:
Game 7: (5) Detroit Red Wings 6, (4) Phoenix Coyotes 1. Red Wings win series 4–3.

Snooker
World Championship in Sheffield, England:
Quarter-finals (best of 25 frames):
Neil Robertson  leads Steve Davis  12–4
Mark Allen  level with Graeme Dott  8–8
Shaun Murphy  leads Ali Carter  5–3
Mark Selby  level with Ronnie O'Sullivan  4–4

April 26, 2010 (Monday)

Basketball
NBA Playoffs (all series best-of-7):
Western Conference First Round:
Game 5: Phoenix Suns 107, Portland Trail Blazers 88. Suns lead series 3–2.
Eastern Conference First Round:
Game 4: Orlando Magic 99, Charlotte Bobcats 90. Magic win series 4–0.
Game 4: Milwaukee Bucks 111, Atlanta Hawks 104. Series tied 2–2.
NBA season awards:
Sportsmanship Award: Grant Hill, Phoenix Suns

Ice hockey
Stanley Cup playoffs (all series best-of-7):
Eastern Conference Quarter-finals:
Game 6: (6) Boston Bruins 4, (3) Buffalo Sabres 3. Bruins win series 4–2.
Game 6: (8) Montreal Canadiens 4, (1) Washington Capitals 1. Series tied 3–3.
Western Conference Quarter-finals:
Game 6: (2) Chicago Blackhawks 5, (7) Nashville Predators 3. Blackhawks win series 4–2.

Snooker
World Championship in Sheffield, England:
Second round (best of 25 frames):
Ronnie O'Sullivan  def. Mark Williams  13–10
Ali Carter  def. Joe Perry  13–11
Mark Selby  def. Stephen Hendry  13–5
Shaun Murphy  def. Ding Junhui  13–10

Tennis
Fed Cup World Group II Play-offs, day 2: (team in bold advance to World Group II in 2011)
 3–2 
Peng Shuai  def. Sofia Arvidsson  6–7(4), 6–1, 8–6
Johanna Larsson  def. Shuai Zhang  2–6, 6–2, 6–3
Han Xinyun/Zhou Yi-Miao  def. Johanna Larsson/Ellen Allgurin  6–3, 6–2

April 25, 2010 (Sunday)

Athletics
World Marathon Majors:
London Marathon:
Men:  Tsegaye Kebede  2:05:19  Emmanuel Mutai  2:06:23  Jaouad Gharib  2:06:55
Standings (after 8 of 11 events): (1) Samuel Wanjiru  & Kebede 50 points (3) Deriba Merga  & Mutai 35
Women:  Liliya Shobukhova  2:22:00  Inga Abitova  2:22:19  Aselefech Mergia  2:22:38
Standings: (1) Shobukhova 60 points (2) Irina Mikitenko  40 points (3) Salina Kosgei  36

Auto racing
NASCAR Sprint Cup Series:
Aaron's 499 in Talladega, Alabama:
(1)  Kevin Harvick (Chevrolet; Richard Childress Racing) (2)  Jamie McMurray (Chevrolet; Earnhardt Ganassi Racing) (3)  Juan Pablo Montoya (Chevrolet; Earnhardt Ganassi Racing)
Drivers' championship standings (after 9 of 36 races): (1)  Jimmie Johnson (Chevrolet, Hendrick Motorsports) 1323 points (2) Harvick 1297 (3)  Greg Biffle (Ford; Roush Fenway Racing) 1237
Nationwide Series:
Aaron's 312 in Talladega, Alabama:
(1)  Brad Keselowski (Dodge, Penske Racing) (2)  Joey Logano (Toyota; Joe Gibbs Racing) (3)  Kevin Harvick (Chevrolet, Kevin Harvick Incorporated)
Drivers' championship standings (after 8 of 35 races): (1) Keselowski 1274 points (2) Harvick 1264 (3)  Kyle Busch (Toyota, Joe Gibbs Racing) 1220
After the event, Keselowski is docked 50 points for rule infractions, reducing his points tally from 1324 to 1274. (NASCAR)

Basketball
NBA Playoffs (all series best-of-7):
Western Conference First Round:
Game 4: San Antonio Spurs 92, Dallas Mavericks 89. Spurs lead series 3–1.
Game 4: Utah Jazz 117, Denver Nuggets 106. Jazz lead series 3–1.
Eastern Conference First Round:
Game 4: Cleveland Cavaliers 121, Chicago Bulls 98. Cavaliers lead series 3–1.
Game 4: Miami Heat 101, Boston Celtics 92. Celtics lead series 3–1.

Chess
World Championship in Sofia, Bulgaria
Game 2: Viswanathan Anand  (White) def. Veselin Topalov  (Black)
Series tied 1–1.

Cycling
Monument Classics:
Liège–Bastogne–Liège:  Alexander Vinokourov  6h 37' 49"  Alexandr Kolobnev  + 6"  Alejandro Valverde  + 1' 04"

Equestrianism
Eventing:
Rolex Kentucky Three Day in Lexington, Kentucky:  William Fox-Pitt , horse:  Cool Mountain  Phillip Dutton , horse: Woodburn  Becky Holder , horse: Courageous Comet

Football (soccer)
CAF Champions League qualification Second round, first leg:
Djoliba  0–1  TP Mazembe
JS Kabylie  2–0  Atlético Petróleos Luanda
Al-Hilal Omdurman  0–1  Ismaily
Dynamos  4–1  Gaborone United
CAF Confederation Cup Second round, first leg:
Simba S.C.  2–1  Haras El Hodood
Petrojet  1–1  CS Sfaxien
AS Vita Club  3–0  Enyimba
Warri Wolves  2–1  CAPS United
 Scottish Premier League, matchday 35 of 38:
Dundee United 0–2 Celtic
Hibernian 0–1 Rangers
Standings: Rangers 83 points, Celtic 72, Dundee United 62.
Rangers win the championship for the 53rd time. Both Rangers and Celtic qualify for the Champions League, while Dundee United qualify for Europa League.
 KNVB Cup Final, first leg:
Ajax 2–0 Feyenoord
 Brazilian state championships finals, first leg:
 São Paulo: Santo André 2–3 Santos
 Rio Grande do Sul: Internacional 0–2 Grêmio
 Ceará: Fortaleza 1–0 Ceará
 Bahia: Bahia 0–1 Vitória
 Minas Gerais: Ipatinga 2–3 Atlético Mineiro
 Santa Catarina: Joinville 1–3 Avaí
 Goiás: Atlético Goianiense 4–0 Santa Helena EC

Golf
PGA Tour:
Zurich Classic of New Orleans in New Orleans, Louisiana:
Winner: Jason Bohn  270 (−18)
Bohn wins his second PGA Tour title.
European Tour:
Ballantine's Championship in Jeju-do, South Korea:
Winner: Marcus Fraser  204 (−12)
Fraser wins his second European Tour title.
Champions Tour:
Liberty Mutual Legends of Golf in Savannah, Georgia:
Winners: Mark O'Meara  & Nick Price  188 (−28)PO
O'Meara wins his first Champions Tour title, and Price wins his second title.

Gymnastics
European Men's Artistic Gymnastics Championships in Birmingham, United Kingdom:
Seniors:
Floor:  Matthias Fahrig   Eleftherios Kosmidis   Daniel Purvis   Marcel Nguyen 
Pommel horse:  Daniel Keatings   Louis Smith   Sašo Bertoncelj 
Rings:  Matteo Morandi   Samir Aït Saïd   Yordan Yovchev 
Vault:  Tomi Tuuha   Fahrig  Flavius Koczi 
Parallel bars:  Yann Cucherat   Vasileios Tsolakidis   Adam Kierzkowski   Hamilton Sabot 
Horizontal bar:  Vlasios Maras   Epke Zonderland   Philipp Boy   Fabian Hambuechen 
Juniors:
Floor:  Max Whitlock   Volkaert Siemon   Adelin Ladislau Kotrong 
Pommel horse:  Whitlock  Oliver Hegi   Daniel Weinert   Artur Davtyan 
Rings:  Néstor Abad   Stephen Micholet   Reiss Beckforf 
Vault:  Davtyan  Fabian Gonzalez   Marco Lodadio 
Parallel bars:  Andrei Vasile Muntean   Hegi  Eddy Yusof 
Horizontal bar:  Sam Oldham   Hegi  Gonzalez  Beckford

Ice hockey
Stanley Cup playoffs (all series best-of-7):
Western Conference Quarter-finals:
Game 6: (4) Phoenix Coyotes 5, (5) Detroit Red Wings 2. Series tied 3–3.
Game 6: (3) Vancouver Canucks 4, (6) Los Angeles Kings 2. Canucks win series 4–2.

Judo
European Championships in Vienna, Austria:
Women Teams:        
Men Teams:

Motorcycle racing
Superbike:
Assen Superbike World Championship round in Assen, Netherlands:
Race 1: (1) Jonathan Rea  (Honda CBR1000RR) (2) James Toseland  (Yamaha YZF-R1) (3) Leon Camier  (Aprilia RSV4 1000)
Race 2: (1) Rea (2) Leon Haslam  (Suzuki GSX-R1000) (3) Toseland
Riders' standings (after 4 of 13 rounds): (1) Haslam 148 points (2) Max Biaggi  (Aprilia RSV4 1000) 128 (3) Rea 110
Manufacturers' standings: (1) Suzuki 148 (2) Aprilia 134 (3) Ducati 130
Supersport:
Assen Supersport World Championship round in Assen, Netherlands:
(1) Eugene Laverty  (Honda CBR600RR) (2) Joan Lascorz  (Kawasaki ZX-6R) (3) Kenan Sofuoğlu  (Honda CBR600RR)
Riders' standings (after 4 of 13 rounds): (1) Lascorz 85 points (2) Sofuoğlu 77 (3) Laverty 66
Manufacturers' standings: (1) Honda 95 (2) Kawasaki 85 (3) Triumph 55

Snooker
World Championship in Sheffield, England:
Second round (best of 25 frames):
Mark Williams  level with Ronnie O'Sullivan  8–8
Ali Carter  leads Joe Perry  10–6
Ding Junhui  leads Shaun Murphy  5–3
Mark Selby  level with Stephen Hendry  4–4

Tennis
ATP World Tour:
Barcelona Open Banco Sabadell in Barcelona, Spain:
Final: Fernando Verdasco  def. Robin Söderling  6–3, 4–6, 6–3
Verdasco wins the fifth title of his career.
Fed Cup World Group Semifinals, day 2: (teams in bold advance to the final)
 5–0 
Flavia Pennetta  def. Petra Kvitová  7–6(3), 6–2
Sara Errani  def. Lucie Hradecká  6–4, 6–2
Sara Errani/Francesca Schiavone  def. Lucie Hradecká/Květa Peschke  6–2, 6–4
 3–2 
Elena Dementieva  def. Melanie Oudin  7–6(4), 0–6, 6–3
Bethanie Mattek-Sands  def. Ekaterina Makarova  6–4, 2–6, 6–3
Liezel Huber/Bethanie Mattek-Sands  def. Elena Dementieva/Alla Kudryavtseva  6–3, 6–1
USA will host reigning champion Italy in a repeat of last year's final.
Fed Cup World Group Play-offs, day 2: (teams in bold advance to the World Group in 2011)
 3–2 
Kaia Kanepi  def. Justine Henin  6–7(6), 6–4, 6–3
Yanina Wickmayer  def. Maret Ani  2–6, 6–1, 6–1
Maret Ani/Margit Rüütel  def. Kirsten Flipkens/Yanina Wickmayer  2–6, 6–4, 6–3
 0–5 
Samantha Stosur  def. Lyudmyla Kichenok  7–6(3), 6–3
Alicia Molik  def. Mariya Koryttseva  2–6, 6–2, 7–5
Rennae Stubbs/Anastasia Rodionova  def. Lyudmyla Kichenok/Nadiia Kichenok  6–2, 6–7(2), 6–1
 2–3 
Andrea Petkovic  def. Aravane Rezaï  6–1, 7–6(2)
Pauline Parmentier  def. Tatjana Malek  7–6(4), 6–4
Julie Coin/Alizé Cornet  def. Kristina Barrois/Andrea Petkovic  6–3, 6–1
 2–3 
Daniela Hantuchová  def. Jelena Janković  7–6(2), 7–5
Bojana Jovanovski  def. Magdaléna Rybáriková  6–1, 7–6(4)
Daniela Hantuchová/Magdaléna Rybáriková  def. Jelena Janković/Ana Jovanović  6–4, 6–3
Fed Cup World Group II Play-offs, day 2: (teams in bold advance to World Group II in 2011)
 1–4 
María José Martínez Sánchez  def. Agnieszka Radwańska  6–3, 6–4
Carla Suárez Navarro  def. Marta Domachowska  6–3, 6–2
Nuria Llagostera Vives/Arantxa Parra Santonja  def. Klaudia Jans/Alicja Rosolska  6–2, 6–4
 5–0 
Aleksandra Wozniak  def. Jorgelina Cravero  6–4, 6–4
Valérie Tétreault  def. Paula Ormaechea  6–7(6), 6–1, 6–1
Sharon Fichman/Marie-Ève Pelletier  def. Jorgelina Cravero/Aranza Salut  6–4, 6–2
 4–1 
Kimiko Date-Krumm  def. Polona Hercog  6–4, 6–2
Katarina Srebotnik  def. Ayumi Morita  6–1, 6–4
Tadeja Majerič/Maša Zec Peškirič  def. Rika Fujiwara/Yurika Sema  6–4, 6–7(1), 6–3
Fed Cup World Group II Play-offs, day 1:
 2–0 
Johanna Larsson  def. Peng Shuai  6–2, 6–4
Sofia Arvidsson  def. Shuai Zhang  6–4, 6–3

April 24, 2010 (Saturday)

Auto racing
Nationwide Series:
Aaron's 312 in Talladega, Alabama: Postponed to April 25 due to the threat of severe weather.

Basketball
NBA Playoffs (all series best-of-7):
Western Conference First Round:
Game 4: Portland Trail Blazers 96, Phoenix Suns 87. Series tied 2–2.
Game 4: Oklahoma City Thunder 110, Los Angeles Lakers 89. Series tied 2–2.
Eastern Conference First Round:
Game 3: Orlando Magic 90, Charlotte Bobcats 86. Magic lead series 3–0.
Game 3: Milwaukee Bucks 107, Atlanta Hawks 89. Hawks lead series 2–1.
NBA season awards:
Executive of the Year: John Hammond, Milwaukee Bucks

Chess
World Championship in Sofia, Bulgaria
Game 1: Veselin Topalov  (White) def. Viswanathan Anand  (Black)
Topalov lead series 1–0.

Curling
World Mixed Doubles Championship in Chelyabinsk, Russia:
Bronze medal game: Spain 7–8  China
Gold medal game:  New Zealand 7–9  Russia

Football (soccer)
CAF Champions League qualification Second round, first leg:
ES Sétif  1–0  Zanaco
Supersport United  0–0  Heartland
CAF Confederation Cup Second round, first leg:
Cotonsport  1–2  Primeiro de Agosto
ASFAN  1–0  DC Motema Pembe
 Greek Cup Final in Athens:
Panathinaikos 1–0 Aris
Panathinaikos win the Cup for the 17th time.

Gymnastics
European Men's Artistic Gymnastics Championships in Birmingham, United Kingdom:
Senior team:      
Junior all round:  Sam Oldham   Max Whitlock   Pablo Braegger

Ice hockey
Stanley Cup playoffs (all series best-of-7):
Eastern Conference Quarter-finals:
Game 6: (4) Pittsburgh Penguins 4, (5) Ottawa Senators 3.  Penguins wins series 4–2.
Western Conference Quarter-finals:
Game 5: (2) Chicago Blackhawks 5, (7) Nashville Predators 4 (OT).  Blackhawks lead series 3–2.
Game 6: (1) San Jose Sharks 5, (8) Colorado Avalanche 2.  Sharks wins series 4–2.

Judo
European Championships in Vienna, Austria:
Women −78 kg:  Abigel Joo   Marhinde Verkerk   Lucie Louette   Maryna Pryshchepa 
Women +78 kg:  Lucija Polavder   Tea Donguzashvili   Karina Bryant   Urszula Sadkowska 
Men −90 kg:  Marcus Nyman   Varlam Liparteliani   Ilias Of Nikos Iliadis   Elkhan Mammadov 
Men −100 kg:  Elco van der Geest   Henk Grol   Benjamin Behrla   Ariel Ze'evi 
Men +100 kg:  Ihar Makarau   Barna Bor   Janusz Wojnarowicz   Andreas Tölzer

Rugby union
2011 Rugby World Cup qualifying:
Asian Five Nations:
 32–8  in Hong Kong
 43–28  Arabian Gulf in Almaty
(International Rugby Board)

Snooker
World Championship in Sheffield, England:
Second round (best of 25 frames):
Steve Davis  def. John Higgins  13–11
Neil Robertson  def. Martin Gould  13–12
Graeme Dott  def. Stephen Maguire  13–6
Mark Williams  level with Ronnie O'Sullivan  4–4
Ali Carter  level with Joe Perry  4–4

Tennis
Fed Cup World Group Semifinals, day 1:
 2–0 
Flavia Pennetta  def. Lucie Hradecká  6–4, 7–5
Francesca Schiavone  def. Lucie Šafářová  6–0, 6–2
 1–1 
Melanie Oudin  def. Alla Kudryavtseva  6–3, 6–3
Elena Dementieva  def. Bethanie Mattek-Sands  6–4, 6–3
Fed Cup World Group Play-offs, day 1:
 2–0 
Kim Clijsters  def. Maret Ani  6–4, 6–2
Yanina Wickmayer  def. Kaia Kanepi  6–2, 4–6, 6–1
 0–2 
Anastasia Rodionova  def. Alona Bondarenko  0–6, 6–3, 7–5
Samantha Stosur  def. Mariya Koryttseva  6–3, 6–0
 1–1 
Andrea Petkovic  def. Pauline Parmentier  6–3, 6–2
Aravane Rezaï  def. Tatjana Malek  2–6, 6–3, 6–0
 1–1 
Jelena Janković  def. Magdaléna Rybáriková  7–6(5), 6–3
Daniela Hantuchová  def. Bojana Jovanovski  6–2, 6–2
Fed Cup World Group II Play-offs, day 1:
 1–1 
Agnieszka Radwańska  def. Carla Suárez Navarro  6–3, 6–1
María José Martínez Sánchez  def. Marta Domachowska  7–6(4), 6–2
 2–0 
Aleksandra Wozniak  def. Paula Ormaechea  6–4, 6–2
Valérie Tétreault  def. Jorgelina Cravero  6–4, 6–3
 2–0 
Katarina Srebotnik  def. Kimiko Date-Krumm  7–5, 6–1
Polona Hercog  def. Ayumi Morita  3–6, 6–1, 6–3

April 23, 2010 (Friday)

Basketball
NBA Playoffs (all series best-of-7):
Western Conference First Round:
Game 3: San Antonio Spurs 94, Dallas Mavericks 90. Spurs lead series 2–1.
Game 3: Utah Jazz 105, Denver Nuggets 93. Jazz lead series 2–1.
Eastern Conference First Round:
Game 3: Boston Celtics 100, Miami Heat 98. Celtics lead series 3–0.

Football (soccer)
CAF Champions League qualification Second round, first leg:
Espérance ST  3–0  Al-Merreikh
Ittihad  2–0  Al-Ahly
CAF Confederation Cup Second round, first leg:
Amal Atbara  1–0  CR Belouizdad
FUS Rabat  2–0  Stade Malien

Golf
 Lorena Ochoa, currently ranked #1 in women's golf, announces that she will retire from the sport after next week's Tres Marias Championship in her home country of Mexico. The 28-year-old Ochoa, with 27 LPGA Tour titles including two majors, indicated that she wanted to raise a family. (AP via ESPN)

Ice hockey
Stanley Cup playoffs (all series best-of-7):
Eastern Conference Quarter-finals:
Game 5: (3) Buffalo Sabres 4, (6) Boston Bruins 1.  Bruins lead series 3–2.
Game 5: (8) Montreal Canadiens 2, (1) Washington Capitals 1.  Capitals lead series 3–2.
Western Conference Quarter-finals:
Game 5: (3) Vancouver Canucks 7, (6) Los Angeles Kings 2. Canucks lead series 3–2.
Game 5: (5) Detroit Red Wings 4, (4) Phoenix Coyotes 1. Red Wings lead series 3–2.

Judo
European Championships in Vienna, Austria:
Women −63 kg:  Elisabeth Willeboordse   Edwige Gwend   Vlora Bedzeti   Vera Koval 
Women −70 kg:  Anett Mészáros   Raša Sraka   Cecilia Blanco   Juliane Robra 
Men −73 kg:  João Pina   Batradz Kaitmazov   Ugo Legrand   Attila Ungvari 
Men −81 kg:  Sirazhudin Magomedov   Aliaksandr Stsiashenka   Euan Burton   Guillaume Elmont

Snooker
World Championship in Sheffield, England:
Second round (best of 25 frames):
Mark Allen  def. Mark Davis  13–5
Steve Davis  leads John Higgins  9–7
Martin Gould  leads Neil Robertson  11–5
Graeme Dott  leads Stephen Maguire  7–1

April 22, 2010 (Thursday)

American football
 Oklahoma Sooners quarterback Sam Bradford is selected as the number one overall pick by the St. Louis Rams in the NFL Draft in New York City.

Basketball
NBA Playoffs (all series best-of-7):
Western Conference First Round:
Game 3: Oklahoma City Thunder 101, Los Angeles Lakers 96. Lakers lead series 2–1.
Game 3: Phoenix Suns 108, Portland Trail Blazers 89. Suns lead series 2–1.
Eastern Conference First Round:
Game 3: Chicago Bulls 108, Cleveland Cavaliers 106. Cavaliers lead series 2–1.
NBA season awards:
Most Improved Player: Aaron Brooks, Houston Rockets

Darts
Premier League round 11 in Liverpool, England: (players in bold advance to semifinals, players in strike are eliminated)
Terry Jenkins  8–4 Ronnie Baxter 
James Wade  8–3 Raymond van Barneveld 
Adrian Lewis  3–8 Mervyn King 
Phil Taylor  8–5 Simon Whitlock 
High Checkout: Taylor 125
Standings after 11 rounds: Taylor 20 points, King 13, Wade, Baxter, Whitlock 11, Lewis 9, Jenkins 8, Barneveld 5.

Football (soccer)
UEFA Europa League Semi-finals, first leg:
Hamburg  0–0  Fulham
Atlético Madrid  1–0  Liverpool
Copa Libertadores Second Stage: (teams in bold advance to the round of 16, teams in strike are eliminated)
Group 1:
Cerro Porteño  0–0  Racing
Corinthians  1–0  Independiente Medellín
Final standings: Corinthians 16 points, Racing 8, Independiente Medellín 6, Cerro Porteňo 2.
Group 5:
Internacional  3–0  Deportivo Quito
Cerro  0–0  Emelec
Final standings: Internacional 12 points, Deportivo Quito 10, Cerro 8, Emelec 2.

Ice hockey
Stanley Cup playoffs (all series best-of-7):
Eastern Conference Quarter-finals:
Game 5: (7) Philadelphia Flyers 3, (2) New Jersey Devils 0. Flyers win series 4–1.
Game 5: (5) Ottawa Senators 4, (4) Pittsburgh Penguins 3 (3 OT). Penguins lead series 3–2.
Western Conference Quarter-finals:
Game 4: (2) Chicago Blackhawks 3, (7) Nashville Predators 0. Series tied 2–2.
Game 5: (1) San Jose Sharks 5, (8) Colorado Avalanche 0. Sharks lead series 3–2.

Judo
European Championships in Vienna, Austria:
Women −48 kg:  Alina Dumitru   Eva Csernoviczky   Oiana Blanco   Charline Van Snick 
Women −52 kg:  Natalia Kuzyutina   Rosalba Forciniti   Ilse Heylen   Pénélope Bonna 
Women −57 kg:  Corina Caprioriu   Sabrina Filzmoser   Hedvig Karakas   Telma Monteiro 
Men −60 kg:  Sofiane Milous   Ludwig Paischer   Jeroen Mooren   Elio Verde 
Men −66 kg:  Sugoi Uriarte   Miklos Ungvari   Rok Draksic   Andreas Mitterfellner

Snooker
World Championship in Sheffield, England:
First round (best of 19 frames):
Shaun Murphy  def. Gerard Greene  10–7
Stephen Maguire  def. Stephen Lee  10–4
Second round (best of 25 frames):
Mark Allen  leads Mark Davis  5–3
Steve Davis  leads John Higgins  6–2

April 21, 2010 (Wednesday)

American football
 The National Football League suspends Pittsburgh Steelers quarterback Ben Roethlisberger for the first six games of the 2010 regular season in the wake of his alleged sexual assault in Georgia. (ESPN)

Basketball
NBA Playoffs (all series best-of-7):
Western Conference First Round:
Game 2: San Antonio Spurs 102, Dallas Mavericks 88. Series tied 1–1.
Eastern Conference First Round:
Game 2: Orlando Magic 92, Charlotte Bobcats 77. Magic lead series 2–0.
NBA season awards:
Coach of the Year: Scott Brooks, Oklahoma City Thunder

Cycling
La Flèche Wallonne:  Cadel Evans  4:39:24  Joaquim Rodríguez  s.t.  Alberto Contador  s.t.

Football (soccer)
UEFA Champions League Semi-finals, first leg:
Bayern Munich  1–0  Lyon
Copa Libertadores Second Stage: (teams in bold advance to the round of 16, teams in strike are eliminated)
Group 2:
Nacional  2–0  Monterrey
São Paulo  1–0  Once Caldas
Final standings: São Paulo 13, Once Caldas 11 points, Monterrey 6, Nacional 3.
Group 6:
Nacional  2–0  Morelia
Banfield  4–1  Deportivo Cuenca
Final standings: Nacional 12 points, Banfield 11, Morelia 5, Deportivo Cuenca 4.
Group 8:
Universidad de Chile  0–0  Universidad Católica
Flamengo  3–2  Caracas
Final standings: Universidad de Chile 12 points, Flamengo 10, Universidad Católica 7, Caracas 2.
AFC Cup group stage, Round 5: (teams in bold advance to the round of 16, teams in strike are eliminated)
Group A:
Shabab Al-Ordon  6–1  Al-Ahli
Saham  1–4  Al-Karamah
Standings (after 5 matches): Al-Karamah 13 points, Shabab Al-Ordon 11, Saham 4, Al-Ahli 0.
Group B: Al-Hilal  0–2  Al-Kuwait
Standings: Churchill Brothers 7 points (3 matches), Al-Kuwait 5 (3), Al-Hilal 1 (4).
Group E:
Al-Rayyan  3–0  Al-Wihdat
Al-Riffa  1–0  Al-Nahda
Standings (after 5 matches): Al-Rayyan, Al-Riffa 12 points, Al-Wihdat 6, Al-Nahda 0.
Group F:
Sriwijaya  5–0  Victory SC
Bình Dương  4–0  Selangor
Standings (after 5 matches): Sriwijaya, Bình Dương 10 points, Selangor 4, Victory SC 4.
CONCACAF Champions League Final, first leg:
Cruz Azul  2–1  Pachuca
 Croatian Cup Final, first leg:
Hajduk Split 2–1 Šibenik

Ice hockey
Stanley Cup playoffs (all series best-of-7):
Eastern Conference Quarter-finals:
Game 4: (1) Washington Capitals 6, (8) Montreal Canadiens 3. Capitals lead series 3–1.
Game 4: (6) Boston Bruins 3, (3) Buffalo Sabres 2 (2OT). Bruins lead series 3–1.
Western Conference Quarter-finals:
Game 4: (3) Vancouver Canucks 6, (6) Los Angeles Kings 4. Series tied 2–2.

Snooker
World Championship in Sheffield, England:
First round (best of 19 frames):
Ding Junhui  def. Stuart Pettman  10–1
Mark Davis  def. Ryan Day  10–8
Neil Robertson  def. Fergal O'Brien  10–5
Graeme Dott  def. Peter Ebdon  10–5
Stephen Maguire  leads Stephen Lee  6–3
Shaun Murphy  leads Gerard Greene  8–1

April 20, 2010 (Tuesday)

Basketball
NBA Playoffs (all series best-of-7):
Western Conference First Round:
Game 2: Los Angeles Lakers 95, Oklahoma City Thunder 92. Lakers lead series 2–0.
Game 2: Phoenix Suns 119, Portland Trail Blazers 90. Series tied 1–1.
Eastern Conference First Round:
Game 2: Atlanta Hawks 96, Milwaukee Bucks 86. Hawks lead series 2–0.
Game 2: Boston Celtics 106, Miami Heat 77. Celtics lead series 2–0.
NBA season awards:
Defensive Player of the Year: Dwight Howard, Orlando Magic

Football (soccer)
UEFA Champions League Semi-finals, first leg:
Internazionale  3–1  Barcelona
Copa Libertadores Second Stage: (teams in bold advance to the round of 16, teams in strike are eliminated)
Group 3:
Bolívar  2–0  Juan Aurich
Estudiantes  1–0  Alianza Lima
Final standings: Estudiantes 13 points, Alianza Lima 12, Juan Aurich 6, Bolívar 4.
AFC Cup group stage, Round 5: (teams in bold advance to the round of 16, teams in strike are eliminated)
Group C:
Nasaf Qarshi  4–0  Al-Ahed
Kazma  0–1  Al-Jaish
Standings (after 5 matches): Kazma, Nasaf Qarshi 10 points, Al-Jaish 7, Al-Ahed 1.
Group D:
Al-Ittihad  2–1  Kingfisher East Bengal
Al-Nejmeh  1–3  Al-Qadsia
Standings (after 5 matches): Al-Qadsia 11 points, Al-Ittihad 10, Al-Nejmeh 7, Kingfisher East Bengal 0.
Group G:
VB Sports Club  4–0  Persiwa Wamena
Muangthong United  0–1  South China
Standings (after 5 matches): South China, Muangthong United 10 points, VB Sports Club 9, Persiwa Wamena 0.
Group H:
SHB Đà Nẵng  0–0  Thai Port
NT Realty Wofoo Tai Po  1–1  Geylang United
Standings (after 5 matches): SHB Đà Nẵng 13 points, Thai Port 8, Geylang United 3, NT Realty Wofoo Tai Po 2.

Ice hockey
Stanley Cup playoffs (all series best-of-7):
Eastern Conference Quarter-finals:
Game 4: (4) Pittsburgh Penguins 7, (5) Ottawa Senators 4. Penguins lead series 3–1.
Game 4: (7) Philadelphia Flyers 4, (2) New Jersey Devils 1. Flyers lead series 3–1.
Western Conference Quarter-finals:
Game 4: (5) Detroit Red Wings 3, (4) Phoenix Coyotes 0. Series tied 2–2.
Game 3: (7) Nashville Predators 4, (2) Chicago Blackhawks 1. Predators lead series 2–1.
Game 4: (1) San Jose Sharks 2, (8) Colorado Avalanche 1 (OT). Series tied 2–2.

Snooker
World Championship in Sheffield, England:
First round (best of 19 frames):
Ronnie O'Sullivan  def. Liang Wenbo  10–7
Steve Davis  def. Mark King  10–9
Ding Junhui  leads Stuart Pettman  8–1
Mark Davis  leads Ryan Day  5–4
Neil Robertson  leads Fergal O'Brien  6–3
Graeme Dott  leads Peter Ebdon  7–2

April 19, 2010 (Monday)

Athletics
World Marathon Majors:
Boston Marathon:
Men:  Robert Kiprono Cheruiyot  2:05:52 (course record)  Tekeste Kebede  2:07:23  Deriba Merga  2:08:39
Women:  Teyba Erkesso  2:26:11  Tatyana Pushkareva  2:26:14  Salina Kosgei  2:28:35

Auto racing
NASCAR Sprint Cup Series:
Samsung Mobile 500 in Fort Worth, Texas:
(1)  Denny Hamlin (Toyota; Joe Gibbs Racing) (2)  Jimmie Johnson (Chevrolet; Hendrick Motorsports) (3)  Kyle Busch (Toyota, Joe Gibbs Racing)
Drivers' championship standings (after 8 of 36 races): (1) Johnson 1248 points (2)  Matt Kenseth (Ford; Roush Fenway Racing) 1140 (3)  Greg Biffle (Ford, Roush Fenway Racing) 1120
Nationwide Series:
O'Reilly 300 in Fort Worth, Texas:
(1)  Kyle Busch (Toyota, Joe Gibbs Racing) (2)  Joey Logano (Toyota, Joe Gibbs Racing) (3)  Reed Sorenson (Toyota, Braun Racing)
Standings (after 7 of 35 races): (1) Busch 1154 points (2)  Brad Keselowski (Dodge, Penske Racing) 1134 (3)  Kevin Harvick (Chevrolet, Kevin Harvick Incorporated) 1089

Basketball
NBA Playoffs (all series best-of-7):
Western Conference First Round:
Game 2: (4) Utah Jazz 114, (5) Denver Nuggets 111. Series tied 1–1.
Eastern Conference First Round:
Game 2: (1) Cleveland Cavaliers 112, (8) Chicago Bulls 102. Cavaliers lead series 2–0.
NBA season awards:
J. Walter Kennedy Citizenship Award: Samuel Dalembert, Philadelphia 76ers

Ice hockey
Stanley Cup playoffs (all series best-of-7):
Eastern Conference Quarter-finals:
Game 3: (1) Washington Capitals 5, (8) Montreal Canadiens 1. Capitals lead series 2–1.
Game 3: (6) Boston Bruins 2, (3) Buffalo Sabres 1. Bruins lead series 2–1.
Western Conference Quarter-finals:
Game 3: (6) Los Angeles Kings 5, (3) Vancouver Canucks 3. Kings lead series 2–1.

Snooker
World Championship in Sheffield, England:
First round (best of 19 frames):
Martin Gould  def. Marco Fu  10–9
Ali Carter  def. Jamie Cope  10–4
Mark Williams  def. Marcus Campbell  10–5
Ronnie O'Sullivan  leads Liang Wenbo  7–2
Mark King  leads Steve Davis  5–4

April 18, 2010 (Sunday)

Auto racing
Formula One:
Chinese Grand Prix in Shanghai, China:
(1) Jenson Button  (McLaren–Mercedes) (2) Lewis Hamilton  (McLaren-Mercedes) (3) Nico Rosberg  (Mercedes)
Drivers' championship standings (after 4 of 19 races): (1) Button 60 points (2) Rosberg 50 (3) Fernando Alonso  (Ferrari) & Hamilton 49
Constructors' championship standings: (1) McLaren 109 (2) Ferrari 90 (3) Red Bull  73
NASCAR Sprint Cup Series:
Samsung Mobile 500 in Fort Worth, Texas: Race is postponed to Monday due to rain.
Nationwide Series:
O'Reilly 300 in Fort Worth, Texas: Race is postponed to Monday due to rain.
IndyCar Series:
Toyota Grand Prix of Long Beach in Long Beach, California:
(1) Ryan Hunter-Reay  (Andretti Autosport) (2) Justin Wilson  (Dreyer & Reinbold Racing) (3) Will Power  (Team Penske)
Drivers' championship standings (after 4 of 17 races): (1) Power 172 points (2) Hélio Castroneves  (Team Penske) 130 (3) Hunter-Reay 129
V8 Supercars:
ITM Hamilton 400 in Hamilton Street Circuit, Hamilton, New Zealand:
Race 8: (1) Jamie Whincup  (Holden Commodore) (2) Garth Tander  (Holden Commodore) (3) Michael Caruso  (Holden Commodore)
Drivers' championship standings (after 8 of 26 races): (1) Whincup 1071 points (2) James Courtney  (Ford Falcon) 867 (3) Mark Winterbottom  (Ford Falcon) 810
World Rally Championship:
Rally of Turkey in Istanbul:   Sébastien Loeb /Daniel Elena  (Citroën C4 WRC) 3:01:38.7  Petter Solberg /Phil Mills  (Citroën C4 WRC) +54.5  Mikko Hirvonen /Jarmo Lehtinen  (Ford Focus WRC)
Drivers' standings (after 4 of 13 races): (1) Loeb 93 points (2) Solberg 53 (3) Hirvonen 52
Manufacturers' standings: (1) Citroën Total World Rally Team 126 points (2) BP Ford World Rally Team 111 (3) Citroën Junior Team 75

Badminton
European Championships in Manchester, England:
Mixed Doubles: Thomas Laybourn /Kamilla Rytter Juhl  [1] def. Robert Mateusiak /Nadieżda Kostiuczyk  [2] 21–19, 18–21, 21–12
Women's Singles: Tine Rasmussen  [2] def. Juliane Schenk  [3] 21–19, 14–21, 21–18
Men's Singles: Peter Gade  [1] def. Jan Ø. Jørgensen  [2] 21–14, 21–11
Women's Doubles: Valeria Sorokina /Nina Vislova  [2] def. Petya Nedelcheva /Anastasia Russkikh  [1] 21–18, 21–14
Men's Doubles: Lars Paaske /Jonas Rasmussen  [2] def. Mathias Boe /Carsten Mogensen  [1] 24–22, 22–20

Basketball
NBA Playoffs (all series best-of-7):
Western Conference First Round:
Game 1: (1) Los Angeles Lakers 87, (8) Oklahoma City Thunder 79. Lakers lead series 1–0.
Game 1: (2) Dallas Mavericks 100, (7) San Antonio Spurs 94. Mavericks lead series 1–0.
Game 1: (6) Portland Trail Blazers 105, (3) Phoenix Suns 100. Blazers lead series 1–0.
Eastern Conference First Round:
Game 1: (2) Orlando Magic 98, (7) Charlotte Bobcats 89. Magic lead series 1–0.
ULEB Eurocup Finals in Vitoria-Gasteiz, Spain:
Third-place game:  Bizkaia Bilbao Basket  76–67  Panellinios BC
Final:  ALBA Berlin  44–67   Power Elec Valencia
Valencia win the Eurocup for the second time.
Matthew Nielsen is named the Finals MVP.

Cricket
Ireland in West Indies:
3rd T20 in Kingston, Jamaica:
 152/4 (15/15 ov);  136/7 (15/15 ov). West Indies XI win by 16 runs, win the 3-match series 3–0.

Curling
Players' Championships in Dawson Creek, British Columbia:
Men's event:
Final:  Kevin Martin def.  Brad Gushue 8–7
Women's event:
Final:  Cheryl Bernard def.  Crystal Webster 6–4

Cycling
UCI ProTour:
Amstel Gold Race:  Philippe Gilbert  6:22:54  Ryder Hesjedal  +0:02  Enrico Gasparotto  +0:02
Tour of Turkey:
Final general classification:  Giovanni Visconti  32:42:28  Tejay van Garderen  +0:29  David Moncoutié  +0:33

Equestrianism
Show jumping:
FEI World Cup Jumping Final in Grand-Saconnex, Switzerland:  Marcus Ehning  on Noltes Küchengirl and Plot Blue  Ludger Beerbaum  on Gotha  Pius Schwizer  on Ulysse and Carlina

Football (soccer)
UEFA Women's Champions League Semi-finals, second leg: (first leg score in parentheses)
Umeå  – (2–3)  Lyon postponed to April 28
Turbine Potsdam  1–0 (0–1)  Duisburg. 1–1 on aggregate, Potsdam win 3–1 on penalties.

Golf
PGA Tour:
Verizon Heritage in Hilton Head Island, South Carolina:
Winner: Jim Furyk  271 (−13)PO
Furyk wins his second PGA Tour title of the season and 15th of his career after a bizarre ending to his sudden-death playoff with Brian Davis , who calls a two-shot penalty on himself on the first playoff hole.
Champions Tour:
Outback Steakhouse Pro-Am in Lutz, Florida:
Winner: Bernhard Langer  133 (−9)
Langer wins his 10th Champions Tour title after the third and final round is called off due to rain.

Gymnastics
European Rhythmic Gymnastics Championships in Bremen, Germany:
Group hoops:   28.200   27.650   27.625
Group ribbons and ropes:   27.600   27.300   27.175

Ice hockey
Stanley Cup playoffs (all series best-of-7):
Eastern Conference Quarter-finals:
Game 3: (7) Philadelphia Flyers 3, (2) New Jersey Devils 2 (OT). Flyers lead series 2–1.
Game 3: (4) Pittsburgh Penguins 4, (5) Ottawa Senators, 2. Penguins lead series 2–1.
Western Conference Quarter-finals:
Game 3: (4) Phoenix Coyotes 4, (5) Detroit Red Wings 2. Coyotes lead series 2–1.
Game 2: (2) Chicago Blackhawks 2, (7) Nashville Predators 0. Series tied 1–1.
Game 3: (8) Colorado Avalanche 1, (1) San Jose Sharks 0 (OT). Avalanche lead series 2–1.

Snooker
World Championship in Sheffield, England:
First round (best of 19 frames):
Mark Allen  def. Tom Ford  10–4
Mark Selby  def. Ken Doherty  10–4
Joe Perry  def. Michael Holt  10–4
Stephen Hendry  def Zhang Anda  10–9
Marco Fu  leads Martin Gould  5–4
Ali Carter  leads Jamie Cope  7–2

Tennis
ATP World Tour:
Monte-Carlo Rolex Masters in Roquebrune-Cap-Martin, France:
Final: Rafael Nadal  def. Fernando Verdasco  6–0, 6–1
Nadal becomes the first player in the Open era to win a tournament six successive times. He also wins his 16th Masters 1000 tournament, and the 37th title of his career.
WTA Tour:
Family Circle Cup in Charleston, South Carolina, United States:
Final: Samantha Stosur  def. Vera Zvonareva  6–0, 6–3
Stosur wins the second title of her career.

Wrestling
European Championships in Baku, Azerbaijan:
Men's Greco-Roman:
84 kg:  Nazmi Avluca   Alexei Mishin   Mélonin Noumonvi  & Jan Fischer 
96 kg:  Aslanbek Khushtov   Tsimafei Dzeinichenka   Soso Jabidze  & Cenk İldem 
120 kg:  Rıza Kayaalp   Radomir Petković   Johan Eurén  & Mindaugas Mizgaitis

April 17, 2010 (Saturday)

Auto racing
Nationwide Series:
O'Reilly 300 in Fort Worth, Texas: Race is postponed from Saturday to Sunday due to rain.
V8 Supercars:
ITM Hamilton 400 in Hamilton, New Zealand:
Race 7: (1) Jamie Whincup  (Holden Commodore) (2) Garth Tander  (Holden Commodore) (3) James Courtney  (Ford Falcon)
Drivers' standings (after 7 of 26 races): (1) Whincup 921 points (2) Courtney 825 (3) Mark Winterbottom  (Ford Falcon) 810

Baseball
 Ubaldo Jiménez of the Colorado Rockies throws the first no-hitter of the 2010 season, and the first in the team's history, in the Rockies' 4–0 win over the Atlanta Braves in Atlanta.
 The Mets defeated the Cardinals in a 20-inning game that ran nearly 7 hours.

Basketball
NBA Playoffs (all series best-of-7):
Western Conference First Round:
Game 1: (4) Denver Nuggets 126, (5) Utah Jazz 113. Nuggets lead series 1–0.
Eastern Conference First Round:
Game 1: (1) Cleveland Cavaliers 96, (8) Chicago Bulls 83. Cavaliers lead series 1–0.
Game 1: (3) Atlanta Hawks 102, (6) Milwaukee Bucks 92. Hawks lead series 1–0.
Game 1: (4) Boston Celtics 85, (5) Miami Heat 76. Celtics lead series 1–0.
ULEB Eurocup Finals in Vitoria-Gasteiz, Spain:
Semifinals:
Power Elec Valencia  92–80  Panellinios BC
ALBA Berlin  77–70  Bizkaia Bilbao Basket

Cricket
Ireland in West Indies:
2nd T20 in Kingston, Jamaica:
 171/7 (20.0 overs);  153/7 (20.0 overs). West Indies XI win by 18 runs, lead the 3-match series 2–0.

Cycling
Asian Championships in Sharjah, United Arab Emirates:
Men's Sprint:  Zhang Miao   Kang Dong-Jin   Yudai Nitta 
Men's Omnium:  Cho Ho-Sung   Kazuhiro Mori   Wu Po-Hung 
Men's Madison:  South Korea  Hong Kong  Japan
Women's Omnium:  Na Ah-Reum   Diao Xiao Juan   Hsiao Mei-Yu

Equestrianism
Four-in-hand–driving:
FEI World Cup Driving Final in Grand-Saconnex, Switzerland:  Boyd Exell , horses: Bill, Carrington Park Ajax, Lucky, Spitfire  Koos de Ronde , horses: Charley, Mario, Mister, Tommy  IJsbrand Chardon , horses: Illem, Inci, Maestoso X-28 Fegyenc, Maestoso X-28 Magus

Football (soccer)
OFC Champions League Final, first leg:
PRK Hekari United  3–0  Waitakere United

Gymnastics
European Rhythmic Gymnastics Championships in Bremen, Germany:
Group all-around:   54.500   53.925   53.600

Ice hockey
Stanley Cup playoffs (all series best-of-7):
Eastern Conference Quarter-finals:
Game 2: (6) Boston Bruins 5,  (3) Buffalo Sabres 3. Series tied 1–1.
Game 2: (1) Washington Capitals 6, (8) Montreal Canadiens 5 (OT). Series tied 1–1.
Western Conference Quarter-finals:
Game 2: (6) Los Angeles Kings 3, (3) Vancouver Canucks 2 (OT). Series tied 1–1.

Snooker
World Championship in Sheffield, England:
First round (best of 19 frames):
John Higgins  def. Barry Hawkins  10–6
Mark Allen  leads Tom Ford  8–1
Joe Perry  leads Michael Holt  7–2
Stephen Hendry  leads Zhang Anda  5–4
Mark Selby  leads Ken Doherty  6–3

Tennis
WTA Tour:
Barcelona Ladies Open in Barcelona, Spain:
Final: Francesca Schiavone  def. Roberta Vinci  6–1, 6–1
Schiavone wins the third title of her career.

Wrestling
European Championships in Baku, Azerbaijan:
Men's Greco-Roman:
55 kg:  Elchin Aliyev   Nazyr Mankiev   Vugar Ragimov  & Péter Módos 
60 kg:  Hasan Aliyev   Kostyantyn Balitskyy   Zaur Kuramagomedov  & Tonimir Sokol 
66 kg:  Ambako Vachadze   Ion Panait   Steeve Guenot  & Tamás Lőrincz 
74 kg:  Aliaksandr Kikiniou   Elvin Mursaliyev   Dmytro Pyshkov  & Péter Bácsi

April 16, 2010 (Friday)

Cycling
Asian Championships in Sharjah, United Arab Emirates:
Women's Scratch:  I Fang-Ju   Lee Min-Hye   Diao Xiao Juan 
Women's Team Sprint:  China  Chinese Taipei  Hong Kong
Other events postponed to Saturday due to heavy wind.

Gymnastics
European Rhythmic Gymnastics Championships in Bremen, Germany:
Individual all-around:  Evgenia Kanaeva  115.900  Daria Kondakova  113.725  Aliya Garayeva  111.375

Ice hockey
Stanley Cup playoffs (all series best-of-7):
Eastern Conference Quarter-finals:
Game 2: (4) Pittsburgh Penguins 2, (5) Ottawa Senators 1.  Series tied 1–1.
Game 2:  at (2) New Jersey Devils 5, (7) Philadelphia Flyers 3. Series tied 1–1.
Western Conference Quarter-finals:
Game 1: (7) Nashville Predators 4, (2) Chicago Blackhawks 1.  Predators lead series 1–0.
Game 2: (5) Detroit Red Wings 7, (4) Phoenix Coyotes 4. Series tied 1–1.
Game 2: (1) San Jose Sharks 6, (8) Colorado Avalanche 5 (OT). Series tied 1–1.

Wrestling
European Championships in Baku, Azerbaijan:
Women's freestyle:
48 kg:  Lorissa Ojortsak   Yana Stadnik   Melanie Lesaffre  & Iwona Matkowska 
55 kg:  Anastasija Grigorjeva   Natalja Golts   Agata Pietrzyk  & Ana Paval 
63 kg:  Ljubow Wolossowa   Audrey Prieto-Bokhashvili   Julia Ostaptschuk  & Elina Wasewa 
72 kg:  Stanka Slatewa   Ekatarina Bukina   Emma Weberg  & Maider Unda Gonzales de Audicana

April 15, 2010 (Thursday)

Cricket
Ireland in West Indies:
Only ODI in Kingston, Jamaica:
 219 (50 overs);  213/4 (44/45 overs; Ramnaresh Sarwan 100*). West Indies win by 6 wickets (D/L).

Cycling
Asian Championships in Sharjah, United Arab Emirates:
Men's 1 km Time Trial:  Zhang Miao   Mohd Hafiz Sufian   Yudai Nitta 
Men's Keirin:  Kazunari Watanabe   Kazuya Narita   Mohd Hafiz Sufian 
Men's Scratch:  Choi Hyung-Min   Evgeniy Sladkov   Thurakit Boonratanathanakorn 
Men's Team Pursuit:  South Korea  China  Hong Kong
Women's Sprint:  Guo Shuang   Gong Jinjie   Lee Wai Sze 
Women's Team Pursuit:  China  South Korea  Chinese Taipei

Darts
Premier League week 10 in Sheffield, England: (players in bold advance to the play-offs)
Terry Jenkins  8–5 Adrian Lewis 
Ronnie Baxter  7–7 Mervyn King 
James Wade  7–7 Phil Taylor 
Raymond van Barneveld  6–8 Simon Whitlock 
High Checkout: Whitlock 154
Standings (after 10 matches): Taylor 18 points, King, Baxter, Whitlock 11, Lewis, Wade 9, Jenkins 6, van Barneveld 5

Football (soccer)
Copa Libertadores Second Stage: (teams in bold advance to the knockout stage, teams in strike are eliminated)
Group 4:
Blooming  1–2  Libertad
Lanús  0–0  Universitario
Final standings: Libertad 12 points, Universitario 10, Lanús 8, Blooming 1.
Group 7:
Colo-Colo  1–1  Cruzeiro
Vélez Sársfield  4–0  Deportivo Italia
Final standings: Vélez Sársfield 13 points, Cruzeiro 11, Colo-Colo 8, Deportivo Italia 1.

Ice hockey
Stanley Cup playoffs (all series best-of-7):
Eastern Conference Quarter-finals:
Game 1: (8) Montreal Canadiens 3, (1) Washington Capitals 2 (OT).  Canadiens lead series 1–0.
Game 1: (3) Buffalo Sabres 2, (6) Boston Bruins 1.  Sabres lead series 1–0.
Western Conference Quarter-finals:
Game 1: (3) Vancouver Canucks 3, (6) Los Angeles Kings 2 (OT).  Canucks lead series 1–0.

Wrestling
European Championships in Baku, Azerbaijan:
Women's freestyle:
51 kg:  Sofia Mattsson   Estera Dobre   Tina Ylinen  & Natalia Budu 
59 kg:  Sona Ahmadli   Taybe Yusein   Meryem Seloum Fattah  & Marianna Sastin 
67 kg:  Nadya Sementsova   Kateryna Burmistrova   Alena Kardashova  & Iryna Tsyrkevich

April 14, 2010 (Wednesday)

Cycling
Asian Championships in Sharjah, United Arab Emirates:
Men's Individual Pursuit:  Jang Sun-jae   Feng Chun-kai   Hossein Askari 
Men's Points Race:  Cho Ho-Sung   Amir Zargari   Kwok Ho Ting 
Men's Team Sprint:  China  Japan  Iran
Women's 500 m Time Trial:  Guo Shuang   Lee Wai Sze   Kim Won-Gyeong 
Women's Individual Pursuit:  Jiang Fan   Na Ah-Reum   Chanpeng Nontasin 
Women's Points Race:  Mayuko Hagiwara   Jamie Wong   Tang Kerong

Football (soccer)
Copa Libertadores Second Stage: (teams in bold advance to the knockout stage, teams in strike are eliminated)
Group 1: Racing  0–2  Corinthians
Standings (after 5 matches): Corinthians 13 points, Racing 7, Independiente Medellín 6, Cerro Porteño 1.
Group 5: Emelec  0–0  Internacional
Standings (after 5 matches): Deportivo Quito 10 points, Internacional 9, Cerro 7, Emelec 1.
Group 8: Universidad Católica  2–0  Flamengo
Standings (after 5 matches): Universidad de Chile 11 points, Flamengo 7, Universidad Católica 6, Caracas 2.
AFC Champions League group stage, Round 5: (teams in bold advance to the knockout stage, teams in strike are eliminated)
Group A:
Esteghlal  2–1  Al-Ahli
Al-Gharafa  4–2  Al-Jazira
Standings (after 5 matches): Esteghlal 11 points, Al-Gharafa 10, Al-Ahli 6, Al-Jazira 1.
Group B:
Al-Wahda  1–0  Zob Ahan
Al-Ittihad  1–1  Bunyodkor
Standings (after 5 matches): Zob Ahan 10 points, Al-Ittihad 8, Bunyodkor 7, Al-Wahda 3.
Group E:
Kawasaki Frontale  3–0  Seongnam Ilhwa Chunma
Melbourne Victory  0–0  Beijing Guoan
Standings (after 5 matches): Seongnam Ilhwa Chunma 12 points, Beijing Guoan 7, Kawasaki Frontale 6, Melbourne Victory 4.
Group F:
Changchun Yatai  0–1  Kashima Antlers
Jeonbuk Hyundai Motors  8–0  Persipura Jayapura
Standings (after 5 matches): Kashima Antlers 15 points, Jeonbuk Hyundai Motors 12, Changchun Yatai 3, Persipura Jayapura 0.

Ice hockey
Stanley Cup playoffs (all series best-of-7):
Eastern Conference Quarter-finals:
Game 1: (5) Ottawa Senators 5, (4) Pittsburgh Penguins 4.  Senators lead series 1–0.
Game 1: (7) Philadelphia Flyers 2, (2) New Jersey Devils 1.  Flyers lead series 1–0.
Western Conference Quarter-finals:
Game 1: (4) Phoenix Coyotes 3, (5) Detroit Red Wings 2.  Coyotes lead series 1–0.
Game 1: (8) Colorado Avalanche 2, (1) San Jose Sharks 1.  Avalanche lead series 1–0.

Wrestling
European Championships in Baku, Azerbaijan:
Men's freestyle:
60 kg:  Opan Sat   Malkhaz Zarkua   Andrei Perpelita  & Vasyl Fedoryshyn 
74 kg:  Denis Tsargush   Kiril Terziev   Chamsulvara Chamsulvarayev  & Batuhan Demirçin 
96 kg:  Khetag Gazyumov   Georgi Gogshelidze   Serhat Balcı  & Aliaksei Dubko

April 13, 2010 (Tuesday)

Baseball
MLB season opening games:
American League:
New York Yankees 7, Los Angeles Angels of Anaheim 5
The Yankees receive their 2009 World Series championship rings before the game, which sees Hideki Matsui's return to Yankee Stadium.
National League:
Los Angeles Dodgers 9, Arizona Diamondbacks 5

Cricket
Canada in West Indies:
Only ODI in Kingston, Jamaica:
 316/4 (50.0 overs, S Chanderpaul 101);  108 (39.2 overs). West Indies win by 208 runs.

Football (soccer)
Copa Libertadores Second Stage: (teams in bold advance to the knockout stage, teams in strike are eliminated)
Group 5: Deportivo Quito  2–1  Cerro
Standings: Deportivo Quito 10 points (5 matches), Internacional 8 (4), Cerro 7 (5), Emelec 0 (4).
Group 8: Caracas  1–3  Universidad de Chile
Standings: Universidad de Chile 11 points (5 matches), Flamengo 7 (4), Universidad Católica 3 (4), Caracas 2 (5).
AFC Champions League group stage, Round 5: (teams in bold advance to the knockout stage, teams in strike are eliminated)
Group C:
Pakhtakor  3–2  Al-Ain
Sepahan  1–0  Al-Shabab
Standings (after 5 matches): Pakhtakor 9 points, Sepahan 8, Al-Shabab 7, Al-Ain 4.
Group D:
Al-Ahli  2–1  Mes Kerman
Al-Hilal  0–0  Al-Sadd
Standings (after 5 matches): Al-Hilal 11 points, Al-Sadd 7, Mes Kerman 6, Al-Ahli 4.
Group G:
Gamba Osaka  2–1  Suwon Samsung Bluewings
Singapore Armed Forces  2–1  Henan Construction
Standings (after 5 matches): Gamba Osaka 11 points, Suwon Samsung Bluewings 10, Singapore Armed Forces 4, Henan Construction 2
Group H:
Shandong Luneng  2–3  Sanfrecce Hiroshima
Pohang Steelers  0–0  Adelaide United
Standings (after 5 matches): Adelaide United, Pohang Steelers 10 points, Sanfrecce Hiroshima 6, Shandong Luneng 3.

Wrestling
European Championships in Baku, Azerbaijan:
Men's freestyle:
55 kg:  Makhmud Magomedov   Radoslav Velikov   Marcel Ewald  & Viktor Lebedev 
66 kg:  Jabrayil Hasanov   Magomedmurad Gadzhiev   Otar Tushishvili  & Adam Sobieraj 
84 kg:  Anzor Urishev   Sharif Sharifov   Stefan Gheorghita  & Mikhail Ganev 
120 kg:  Beylal Makhov   Fatih Çakıroğlu   Alexei Shemarov  & Dimitar Kumchev

April 12, 2010 (Monday)

Baseball
MLB season Opening Day games:
American League:
Texas Rangers 4, Cleveland Indians 2 (10 innings)
Minnesota Twins 5, Boston Red Sox 2
This is the first regular-season game at Target Field.
Prior to the game, the Minnesota Twins unveil a new statue honoring late Hall of Famer Kirby Puckett outside the stadium.
Oakland Athletics 4, Seattle Mariners 0
Chicago White Sox 8, Toronto Blue Jays 7 (11 innings)
National League:
Chicago Cubs 9, Milwaukee Brewers 5
Philadelphia Phillies 7, Washington Nationals 4
St. Louis Cardinals 5, Houston Astros 0
San Diego Padres 17, Atlanta Braves 2

Cycling
Asian Championships in Sharjah, United Arab Emirates:
Men's Road Race, 162 km:  Mehdi Sohrabi  3h 27' 21"  Takashi Miyazawa  + 1' 26"  Hossein Nateghi  1' 26"

April 11, 2010 (Sunday)

Athletics
Paris Marathon:
Men:  Tadesse Tola  2:06:40  Alfred Kering  2:07:10  Wilson Kipsang  2:07:10
Women:  Atsede Baysa  2:22:02 (course record)  Christelle Daunay  2:24:22  Beyene Tsegaye Tirfi  2:24:49

Auto racing
IndyCar Series:
Indy Grand Prix of Alabama in Birmingham, Alabama:
(1) Hélio Castroneves  (Team Penske) (2) Scott Dixon  (Chip Ganassi Racing) (3) Dario Franchitti  (Chip Ganassi Racing)
Driver standings (after 3 of 17 races): (1) Will Power  (Team Penske) 136 points (2) Castroneves 104 (3) Franchitti 94.

Basketball
EuroLeague Women Final Four in Valencia, Spain:
Third place game: Wisła Can-Pack Kraków  50–84   UMMC Ekaterinburg
Final:  Ros Casares Valencia  80–87   Spartak Moscow Region
Spartak Moscow Region win the title for the fourth straight time.
Diana Taurasi was named the Final Four MVP.
 German Cup Final:
Brose Baskets 76–75 Deutsche Bank Skyliners

Cricket
Ireland in West Indies:
1st T20 in Trelawny, Jamaica:
 143/8 (20.0 overs),  112/7 (20.0 overs). West Indies XI win by 31 runs, lead 3–match series 1–0.

Curling
World Men's Championship in Cortina d'Ampezzo, Italy:
Bronze medal game:   6–4 
Final:   9–3

Cycling
Monument Classics:
Paris–Roubaix:  Fabian Cancellara  6h 35' 10"  Thor Hushovd  + 2' 00"  Juan Antonio Flecha  + 2' 00"
Asian Championships in Sharjah, United Arab Emirates:
Women's Road Race, 97.2 km:  You Jin-A  2h 48' 57"  Natalya Stefanskaya  s.t.  Jutatip Maneephan  s.t.

Football (soccer)
2011 FIFA Women's World Cup qualification (UEFA):
Group 5:  5–1 
Standings:  15 points (6 matches),  12 (4), Turkey 6 (5),  3 (4), Malta 0 (5)
UEFA Women's Champions League Semi-finals, first leg:
Duisburg  1–0  Turbine Potsdam

Golf
Men's majors:
The Masters in Augusta, Georgia, United States (all USA unless otherwise indicated):
(1) Phil Mickelson 272 (−16) (2) Lee Westwood  275 (−13) (3) Anthony Kim 276 (−12)
Mickelson wins his third Masters and fourth major title. In his first tournament after his self-imposed absence, Tiger Woods finishes tied for fourth with K.J. Choi .
European Tour:
Madeira Island Open in Porto Santo, Madeira, Portugal:
Winner: James Morrison  268 (−20)
Morrison wins his first European Tour title.

Motorcycle racing
Moto GP:
Qatar motorcycle Grand Prix in Doha, Qatar:
MotoGP: (1) Valentino Rossi  (Yamaha) 42:50.099 (2) Jorge Lorenzo  (Yamaha) +1.022 (3) Andrea Dovizioso  (Honda) +1.865
Moto2: (1) Shoya Tomizawa  (Suter) 41:11.768 (2) Alex Debón  (FTR) + 4.656 (3) Jules Cluzel  (Suter) + 4.789
125 cc: (1) Nicolás Terol  (Aprilia) 38:25.644 (2) Efrén Vázquez  (Derbi) + 2.395 (3) Marc Márquez  (Derbi) + 2.420
Superbike:
Valencia Superbike World Championship round in Valencia, Spain:
Race 1: (1) Leon Haslam  (Suzuki GSX-R1000) (2) Max Biaggi  (Aprilia RSV 4) (3) James Toseland  (Yamaha YZF-R1)
Race 2: (1) Noriyuki Haga  (Ducati 1098R) (2) Carlos Checa  (Ducati 1098R) (3) Biaggi
Riders' standings (after 3 of 13 rounds): (1) Haslam 123 points (2) Biaggi 105 (3) Checa 80
Manufacturers' standings: (1) Suzuki 123 (2) Ducati 107 (3) Aprilia 105
Supersport:
Valencia Supersport World Championship round in Valencia, Spain:
(1) Joan Lascorz  (Kawasaki ZX-6R) (2) Kenan Sofuoğlu  (Honda CBR600RR) (3) Chaz Davies  (Triumph Daytona 675)
Riders' standings (after 3 of 13 rounds): (1) Lascorz 65 points (2) Sofuoğlu 61 (3) Eugene Laverty  (Honda CBR600RR) 41
Manufacturers' standings: (1) Honda 70 (2) Kawasaki 65 (3) Triumph 42

Rugby union
Heineken Cup Quarter-finals:
Toulouse  42–16  Stade Français
Amlin Challenge Cup Quarter-finals:
London Wasps  42–26  Gloucester
Newcastle Falcons  20–55  Cardiff Blues

Tennis
ATP World Tour:
Grand Prix Hassan II in Casablanca, Morocco:
Final: Stanislas Wawrinka  def. Victor Hănescu  6–2, 6–3
Wawrinka wins the second title of his career after five successive losses in finals.
U.S. Men's Clay Court Championships in Houston, United States:
Final: Juan Ignacio Chela  def. Sam Querrey  5–7, 6–4, 6–3
Chela wins the fifth title of his career after a break of three years.
WTA Tour:
MPS Group Championships in Ponte Vedra Beach, United States:
Final: Caroline Wozniacki  def. Olga Govortsova  6–2, 7–5
Wozniacki wins the tournament for the second straight year and the seventh title of her career.
Andalucia Tennis Experience in Marbella, Spain:
Final: Flavia Pennetta  def. Carla Suárez Navarro  6–2, 4–6, 6–3
Pennetta wins the ninth title of her career.

Triathlon
ITU World Championships:
Event 1 in Sydney:
Men's:  Bevan Docherty   Alexander Brukhankov    David Hauss 
Women's:  Barbara Riveros Diaz   Andrea Hewitt   Emma Moffatt

Weightlifting
European Championships in Minsk, Belarus:
Men's 105kg:
Snatch:  Andrei Aramnau  195 kg   Vladimir Smorchkov  193 kg   Dmitry Klokov  185 kg
Clean & Jerk:  Aramnau 225 kg  Klokov 224 kg  Oleksiy Torokhty  221 kg
Total:  Aramnau 420 kg  Klokov 409 kg  Smorchkov 408 kg
Men's +105kg:
Snatch:  Evgeny Chigishev  205 kg   Ruben Aleksanyan  195 kg   Almir Velagic  190 kg
Clean & Jerk:  Aleksanyan 237 kg  Matthias Steiner  236 kg  Chigishev 235 kg
Total:  Chigishev 440 kg   Aleksanyan 432 kg  Steiner 426 kg

April 10, 2010 (Saturday)

Auto racing
NASCAR Sprint Cup Series:
Subway Fresh Fit 600 in Avondale, Arizona:
(1)  Ryan Newman (Chevrolet, Stewart Haas Racing) (2)  Jeff Gordon (Chevrolet, Hendrick Motorsports) (3)  Jimmie Johnson (Chevrolet, Hendrick Motorsports)
Standings (after 7 of 36 races): (1) Johnson 1073 points (2)  Matt Kenseth (Ford, Roush Fenway Racing) 1037 (3)  Greg Biffle (Ford, Roush Fenway Racing) 981

Curling
World Men's Championship in Cortina d'Ampezzo, Italy:
Playoff 3 vs. 4:  6–4 
Semifinal:  9–7

Cycling
UCI ProTour:
Tour of the Basque Country:
Stage 6:  Chris Horner  32' 33"  Alejandro Valverde   + 8"  Maxime Monfort  + 13"
Final General classification: (1) Horner  23h 27' 30" (2) Valverde  + 7" (3) Beñat Intxausti  + 58"
Asian Championships in Sharjah, United Arab Emirates:
Men's Individual Time Trial, 42.6 km:  Andrey Mizurov  52' 59.66"  Hossein Askari  + 20.80"  Eugen Wacker  + 1' 31.48"

Figure skating
ISU World Synchronized Skating Championships in Colorado Springs, United States:
 Rockettes ( 1) 223.90  Marigold IceUnity ( 2) 216.98  Haydenettes ( 1) 216.48
This is the second title in three years for Rockettes and the fifth title for Finland.

Football (soccer)
UEFA Women's Champions League Semi-finals, first leg:
Lyon  3–2  Umeå

Golf
Men's majors:
The Masters in Augusta, Georgia, United States:
Leaderboard after third round (USA unless stated): (1) Lee Westwood  204 (−12) (2) Phil Mickelson 205 (−11) (3) Tiger Woods & K. J. Choi  208 (−8)

Horse racing
Grand National in Aintree, Merseyside, England:  Don't Push It (trainer: Jonjo O'Neill, jockey: Tony McCoy)  Black Apalachi (trainer: Dessie Hughes, jockey: Denis O'Regan)  State of Play (trainer: Evan Williams, jockey: Paul Moloney)
At his 15th attempt at the race, 14-time champion jockey McCoy wins his first Grand National.

Ice hockey
NCAA Division I Men's Tournament Final in Detroit:
Boston College 5, Wisconsin 0
 In front of a crowd of 37,592, the largest ever to watch an indoor ice hockey game, the Eagles win their second national title in three years and fourth overall.

Mixed martial arts
UFC 112 in Abu Dhabi:
Middleweight Championship bout: Anderson Silva  (c) def. Demian Maia  via unanimous decision (50–45, 50–45, 49–46) to retain the UFC Middleweight Championship.
Silva breaks the record for the most consecutive title defenses with 6.
Lightweight Championship bout: Frankie Edgar  def. B.J. Penn  (c) via unanimous decision (50–45, 48–47, 49–46) to win the UFC Lightweight Championship.
Welterweight bout: Matt Hughes  def. Renzo Gracie  via TKO (strikes) at 4:40 of round 3.
Lightweight bout: Rafael dos Anjos  def. Terry Etim  via submission (armbar) at 4:30 of round 2.
Middleweight bout: Mark Muñoz  def. Kendall Grove  via TKO (strikes) at 2:50 of round 2.

Rugby union
Heineken Cup Quarter-finals:
Biarritz  29–28  Ospreys in Donostia-San Sebastián, Spain
Munster  33–19  Northampton Saints
Amlin Challenge Cup Quarter-finals:
Connacht  23–20  Bourgoin
Toulon  38–12  Scarlets

Volleyball
Men's CEV Champions League Final Four in Łódź, Poland:
Postponed due to the air crash in which 96 people were killed, including President of Poland Lech Kaczyński.

Weightlifting
European Championships in Minsk, Belarus:
Women's 75kg:
Snatch:  Natalya Zabolotnaya  129 kg  Nadezhda Evstyukhina  127 kg  Hripsime Khurshudyan  122 kg
Clean & Jerk:  Zabolotnaya 156 kg  Evstyukhina 155 kg  Khurshudyan 151 kg
Total:  Zabolotnaya 285 kg  Evstyukhina 282 kg  Khurshudyan 273 kg
Men's 94kg:
Snatch:  Artem Ivanov  180 kg   Arsen Kasabiev  176 kg   Rovshan Fatullayev  175 kg
Clean & Jerk:  Kasabiev 216 kg  Fatullayev 215 kg  Antolii Ciricu  208 kg
Total:  Kasabiev 392 kg  Fatullayev 390 kg  Ivanov 383 kg
Women's +75kg:
Snatch:  Tatiana Kashirina  135 kg  Olha Korobka  123 kg  Ümmühan Uçar  117 kg
Clean & Jerk:  Kashirina 162 kg  Korobka 150 kg  Volha Kniazhyshcha  141 kg
Total:  Kashirina 297 kg  Korobka 273 kg  Kniazhyshcha 257 kg

April 9, 2010 (Friday)

Auto racing
Nationwide Series:
Bashas' Supermarkets 200 in Avondale, Arizona:
(1)  Kyle Busch (Toyota, Joe Gibbs Racing) (2)  Kevin Harvick (Chevrolet, Kevin Harvick Incorporated) (3)  Brad Keselowski (Dodge, Penske Racing)
Standings (after 6 of 35 races): (1) Keselowski 974 points (2)  Carl Edwards (Ford, Roush Fenway Racing) 970 (3) Busch 959

Baseball
MLB season opening games:
American League:
Detroit Tigers 5, Cleveland Indians 2
Toronto Blue Jays 7, Baltimore Orioles 6
National League:
Colorado Rockies 7, San Diego Padres 0
San Francisco Giants 5, Atlanta Braves 4 (13 innings)
Los Angeles Dodgers 7, Florida Marlins 3

Basketball
EuroLeague Women Final Four in Valencia, Spain:
Semifinals:
Wisła Can-Pack Kraków  59–86  Ros Casares Valencia
UMMC Ekaterinburg  79–87  Spartak Moscow Region

Curling
World Men's Championship in Cortina d'Ampezzo, Italy:
Playoff 1 vs. 2:  5–11

Cycling
UCI ProTour:
Tour of the Basque Country:
Stage 5:  Joaquim Rodríguez  4h 07' 52"  Samuel Sánchez  + 14"  Alejandro Valverde   + 14"
General classification: (1) Valverde  22h 54' 56" (2) Chris Horner  + 1" (3) Rodríguez + 34"
Asian Championships in Sharjah, United Arab Emirates:
Women's Individual Time Trial, 28.4 km:  Son Eun-Ju  39' 48.43"  Mayuko Hagiwara  + 9.58"  Monrudee Chapookam  + 29.35"

Figure skating
ISU World Synchronized Skating Championships in Colorado Springs, United States:
Short program: (1) Rockettes ( 1) 81.40 (2) Haydenettes ( 1) 78.62 (3) Black Ice ( 2) 76.26

Golf
Men's majors:
The Masters in Augusta, Georgia, United States:
Leaderboard after second round (USA unless stated): (1) Ian Poulter  & Lee Westwood  136 (−8) (3) Tiger Woods, K. J. Choi , Ricky Barnes, Anthony Kim & Phil Mickelson 138 (−6)
Italian amateur Matteo Manassero becomes the youngest player ever to make the cut at Augusta, at age .

Rugby union
Heineken Cup Quarter-finals:
Leinster  29–28  Clermont

Weightlifting
European Championships in Minsk, Belarus:
Women's 69kg:
Snatch:  Oxana Slivenko  117 kg  Meline Daluzyan  115 kg  Shemshat Tuliayeva  115 kg
Clean & Jerk:  Slivenko 145 kg  Daluzyan 145 kg  Yuliya Artemova  131 kg
Total:  Slivenko 262 kg  Daluzyan 260 kg  Tuliayeva 244 kg
Men's 85kg:
Snatch:  Mikalai Novikau  171 kg  Izzet Ince  170 kg  Ara Khachatryan  165 kg
Clean & Jerk:  Gevorik Poghosyan  204 kg  Khachatryan 203 kg  Iurii Chykyda  197 kg
Total:  Poghosyan 369 kg  Khachatryan 368 kg  Novikau 367 kg

April 8, 2010 (Thursday)

Basketball
EuroCup Women Final, second leg: (first leg score in parentheses)
Sony Athinaikos  53–57 (65–57)  Nadezhda. Sony Athinaikos win 118–114 on aggregate.

Curling
World Men's Championship in Cortina d'Ampezzo, Italy: (teams in bold advance to the playoff)
Draw 15:
 4–8 
 5–6 
 3–9 
 9–7 
Draw 16:
 8–9 
 8–2 
 7–6 
 6–3 
Draw 17:
 9–7 
 8–9 
 6–4 
 10–2 
Final standings: Norway 10–1, Canada 9–2, Scotland, USA 8–3, Denmark 7–4, Switzerland, Germany 5–6, Sweden 4–7, France, Italy, China 3–8, Japan 1–10.

Cycling
UCI ProTour:
Tour of the Basque Country:
Stage 4:  Samuel Sánchez  4h 05' 16"  Alejandro Valverde  + 2"  Robert Gesink  + 2"
General classification: (1) Valverde  18h 46' 50" (2) Chris Horner  + 1" (3) Gesink + 1"

Darts
Premier League round 9 in Glasgow, Scotland:
Raymond van Barneveld  6–8 Adrian Lewis 
Simon Whitlock  8–3 Terry Jenkins 
Ronnie Baxter  4–8 Phil Taylor 
Mervyn King  4–8 James Wade 
High Checkout: King 161
Standings (after 9 matches): Taylor 17 points, King, Baxter 10, Whitlock, Lewis 9, Wade 8, van Barneveld 5, Jenkins 4.

Football (soccer)
UEFA Europa League Quarter-finals, second leg: (first leg score in parentheses)
Wolfsburg  0–1 (1–2)  Fulham. Fulham win 3–1 on aggregate.
Standard Liège  1–3 (1–2)  Hamburg. Hamburg win 5–2 on aggregate.
Atlético Madrid  0–0 (2–2)  Valencia. 2–2 on aggregate, Atlético Madrid win on away goals.
Liverpool  4–1 (1–2)  Benfica. Liverpool win 5–3 on aggregate.
Copa Libertadores Second Stage: (teams in bold advance to the round of 16, teams in strike are eliminated)
Group 1: Independiente Medellín  1–0  Cerro Porteño
Standings: Corinthians 10 points (4 matches), Racing 7 (4), Independiente Medellín 6 (5), Cerro Porteño 1 (5).
Group 3: Alianza Lima  1–0  Bolívar
Standings (after 5 matches): Alianza Lima 12 points, Estudiantes 10, Juan Aurich 6, Bolívar 1.
Group 8: Flamengo  2–2  Universidad de Chile
Standings (after 4 matches): Universidad de Chile 8 points, Flamengo 7, Universidad Católica 3, Caracas 2.

Golf
Men's majors:
The Masters in Augusta, Georgia, United States:
Leaderboard after first round (USA unless stated otherwise): (1) Fred Couples 66 (−6) (2) Tom Watson, Lee Westwood , Phil Mickelson, Y.E. Yang , K.J. Choi  67 (−5)
 Tiger Woods shoots 68 (−4) in his first competitive round since his sex scandal.

Ice hockey
NHL:
In their last regular-season game at Mellon Arena, the Pittsburgh Penguins defeat the New York Islanders 7–3. Pens superstar Sidney Crosby becomes the third-youngest player in NHL history to collect 500 career points.
NCAA Division I Men's Frozen Four in Detroit:
Wisconsin 8, RIT 1
Boston College 7, Miami (OH) 1

Weightlifting
European Championships in Minsk, Belarus:
Women's 63kg:
Snatch:  Svetlana Tsarukaeva  114 kg  Sibel Şimşek  110 kg  Marina Shainova  100 kg
Clean & Jerk:  Şimşek 134 kg  Tsarukaeva 130 kg  Roxana Cocos  130 kg
Total:  Şimşek 244 kg  Tsarukaeva 244 kg  Valiantsi Liakhavets  229 kg
Men's 77kg:
Snatch:  Tigran Martirosyan  165 kg  Mikalai Cherniak  161 kg  Krzysztof Szramiak  160 kg
Clean & Jerk:  Martirosyan 195 kg  Szramiak 191 kg  Erkand Qerimaj  190 kg
Total:  Martirosyan 360 kg  Szramiak 351 kg  Cherniak 346 kg

April 7, 2010 (Wednesday)

Curling
World Men's Championship in Cortina d'Ampezzo, Italy: (teams in bold advance to the playoff, teams in italics secure at least a tiebreak berth, teams in strike are eliminated)
Draw 12:
 3–12 
 7–2 
 5–8 
 9–7 
Draw 13:
 3–5 
 7–5 
 7–5 
 7–1 
Draw 14:
 6–4 
 7–4 
 8–3 
 10–4 
Standings after draw 14: Canada, Norway 8–1, Scotland 7–2, USA 6–3, Germany, Denmark 5–4, Switzerland 4–5, China, France, Sweden 3–6, Italy 2–7, Japan 0–9.

Cycling
UCI ProTour:
Tour of the Basque Country:
Stage 3:  Francesco Gavazzi  4h 49' 52"  Óscar Freire  s.t.  Peter Velits  s.t.
General classification: (1) Freire  14h 41' 30" (2) Alejandro Valverde  + 2" (3) Ryder Hesjedal  + 3"

Football (soccer)
2011 FIFA Women's World Cup qualification (UEFA):
Group 5:  5–1 
Standings: Spain 15 points (6 matches), England 12 (4), Turkey 6 (5), Austria 3 (4), Malta 0 (5).
UEFA Champions League Quarter-finals, second leg: (first leg score in parentheses)
Bordeaux  1–0 (1–3)  Lyon. Lyon win 3–2 on aggregate.
Lyon reach the semifinal for the first time in their history.
Manchester United  3–2 (1–2)  Bayern Munich. 4–4 on aggregate, Bayern Munich win on away goals.
With Manchester United's defeat, the UEFA Champions League will be without an English side in its semifinal for the first time since 2002–03.
Copa Libertadores Second Stage: (teams in bold advance to the round of 16, teams in strike are eliminated)
Group 6: Deportivo Cuenca  0–0  Nacional
Standings (after 5 matches): Nacional 9 points, Banfield 8, Morelia 5, Deportivo Cuenca 4.
Group 8: Flamengo  –  Universidad de Chile. Postponed to April 8 due to heavy rain and flooding in Rio de Janeiro.
AFC Cup group stage, Round 4: (teams in bold advance to the round of 16, teams in strike are eliminated)
Group A:
Al-Ahli  0–1  Al-Karamah
Shabab Al-Ordon  3–1  Saham
Standings (after 4 matches): Al-Karamah 10 points, Shabab Al-Ordon 8, Saham 4, Al-Ahli 0.
Group C:
Al-Jaish  6–3  Al-Ahed
Kazma  0–0  Nasaf Qarshi
Standings (after 4 matches): Kazma 10 points, Nasaf Qarshi 7, Al-Jaish 4, Al-Ahed 1.
Group E:
Al-Riffa  1–4  Al-Rayyan
Al-Nahda  1–3  Al-Wihdat
Standings (after 4 matches): Al-Rayyan, Al-Riffa 9 points, Al-Wihdat 6, Al-Nahda 0.
Group G:
Persiwa Wamena  0–2  South China
VB Sports Club  2–3  Muangthong United
Standings (after 4 matches): Muangthong United 10 points, South China 7, VB Sports Club 6, Persiwa Wamena 0.
CONCACAF Champions League Semifinals, second leg: (first leg score in parentheses)
Pachuca  1–0 (1–1)  Toluca. Pachuca win 2–1 on aggregate.

Weightlifting
European Championships in Minsk, Belarus:
Women's 58kg:
Snatch:  Nastassia Novikava  105 kg  Romela Begaj  96 kg  Marieta Gotfryd  96 kg
Clean & Jerk:  Novikava 133 kg  Begaj 111 kg  Gotfryd 110 kg
Total:  Novikava 238 kg  Begaj (ALB) 207 kg  Gotfryd (POL) 206 kg
Men's 69kg:
Snatch:  Ninel Miculescu  153 kg  Mete Binay  149 kg  Mikhail Gobeev  148 kg
Clean & Jerk:  Miculescu 180 kg  Gobeev 171 kg  Alexandru Spac  168 kg
Total:  Miculescu 333 kg  Gobeev 319 kg  Binay 314 kg

April 6, 2010 (Tuesday)

Baseball
MLB season opening games:
American League:
 Tampa Bay Rays 4, Baltimore Orioles 3

Basketball
NCAA Division I Women's Tournament Final in San Antonio:
Connecticut 53, Stanford 47
 The Huskies complete a second consecutive unbeaten championship season and extend their record in NCAA final games to 7–0.

Curling
World Men's Championship in Cortina d'Ampezzo, Italy:
Draw 9:
 7–5 
 10–4 
 6–2 
 1–7 
Draw 10:
 7–4 
 10–5 
 9–4 
 9–5 
Draw 11:
 5–7 
 9–6 
 6–7 
 5–6 
Standings after draw 11: Canada, Scotland, Norway 6–1, Denmark 5–2, Germany, USA 4–3, Switzerland 3–4, China, Italy,  France, Sweden 2–5, Japan 0–7.

Cycling
UCI ProTour:
Tour of the Basque Country:
Stage 2:  Alejandro Valverde   5h 53' 40"  Óscar Freire  s.t.  Francesco Gavazzi  + 1"
General classification: (1) Valverde  9h 51' 38" (2) Freire s.t. (3) Ryder Hesjedal  + 1"

Football (soccer)
UEFA Champions League Quarter-finals, second leg: (first leg score in parentheses)
CSKA Moscow  0–1 (0–1)  Internazionale. Internazionale win 2–0 on aggregate.
Barcelona  4–1 (2–2)  Arsenal. Barcelona win 6–3 on aggregate.
Lionel Messi scores all four goals for Barcelona, his fourth hat-trick in all competitions in 2010 alone. Messi also became the sixth player in Champions League history to score four goals in a match.
Copa Libertadores Second Stage: (teams in bold advance to the round of 16, teams in strike are eliminated)
Group 4: Universitario  0–0  Blooming
Standings (after 5 matches):  Libertad, Universitario 9 points,  Lanús 7, Blooming 1.
Group 7: Deportivo Italia  2–3  Colo-Colo
Standings (after 5 matches):  Cruzeiro,  Vélez Sársfield 10 points, Colo-Colo 7, Deportivo Italia 1.
AFC Cup group stage, Round 4: (teams in bold advance to the round of 16, teams in strike are eliminated)
Group B: Churchill Brothers  1–0  Al-Hilal
Standings: Churchill Brothers 7 points (3 matches),  Al-Kuwait 2 (2), Al-Hilal 1 (3).
Group D:
Al-Nejmeh  1–0  Al-Ittihad
Al-Qadsia  4–1  Kingfisher East Bengal
Standings (after 4 matches): Al-Qadsia 8 points, Al-Ittihad, Al-Nejmeh 7 points, Kingfisher East Bengal 0.
Group F:
Bình Dương  2–1  Sriwijaya
Selangor  5–0  Victory SC
Standings (after 4 matches): Sriwijaya, Bình Dương 7 points, Selangor, Victory SC 4
Group H:
Geylang United  0–1  Thai Port
NT Realty Wofoo Tai Po  1–2  SHB Đà Nẵng
Standings (after 4 matches): SHB Đà Nẵng 12 points, Thai Port 7, Geylang United 2, NT Realty Wofoo Tai Po 1.
CONCACAF Champions League Semifinals, second leg: (first leg score in parentheses)
Cruz Azul  5–0 (0–1)  UNAM. Cruz Azul win 5–1 on aggregate.

Weightlifting
European Championships in Minsk, Belarus:
Women's 53kg:
Snatch:  Aylin Daşdelen  88 kg  Valiantsi Liakhavets  87 kg  Boyanka Kostova  87 kg
Clean & Jerk:  Daşdelen 120 kg (ER)  Kostova 112 kg   Liakhavets 111 kg
Total:  Daşdelen 208 kg  Kostova 199 kg  Liakhavets (BLR) 198 kg
Men's 62kg:
Snatch:  Erol Bilgin  139 kg  Bünyamin Sezer  136 kg  Henadzi Makhveyenia  136 kg
Clean & Jerk:  Antoniu Buci  165 kg  Bilgin 165 kg Zülfügar Süleymanov  162 kg
Total:  Bilgin 304 kg  Buci 300 kg  Süleymanov 294 kg

April 5, 2010 (Monday)

Baseball
MLB season opening games:
American League:
Chicago White Sox 6, Cleveland Indians 0
Texas Rangers 5, Toronto Blue Jays 4
Detroit Tigers 8, Kansas City Royals 4
Los Angeles Angels of Anaheim 6, Minnesota Twins 3
Seattle Mariners 5, Oakland Athletics 3
National League:
Philadelphia Phillies 11, Washington Nationals 1
New York Mets 7, Florida Marlins 1
St. Louis Cardinals 11, Cincinnati Reds 6
Pittsburgh Pirates 11, Los Angeles Dodgers 5
Colorado Rockies 5, Milwaukee Brewers 3
Atlanta Braves 16, Chicago Cubs 5
Arizona Diamondbacks 6, San Diego Padres 3
San Francisco Giants 5, Houston Astros 2

Basketball
NCAA Division I Men's Tournament Final in Indianapolis:
Duke 61, Butler 59
The Blue Devils win their fourth NCAA championship.
Basketball Hall of Fame Class of 2010:
Players: Cynthia Cooper, Dennis Johnson, Gus Johnson, Karl Malone, Maciel Pereira, Scottie Pippen
Coaches: Bob Hurley Sr.
Contributors: Jerry Buss
Teams: 1960 USA Olympic Team, 1992 USA Olympic Men's Team (aka the "Dream Team")

Cricket
ICC Intercontinental Shield in Windhoek, day 3:
 214 (84.5 overs) and 184 (47.1 overs);  583/8d (114.5 overs; Craig Williams 110*). Namibia win by an innings and 185 runs.
Standings (after 2 matches):  29 points, Namibia 26,  17, Bermuda 0.

Curling
World Men's Championship in Cortina d'Ampezzo, Italy:
Draw 6:
 7–4 
 8–3 
 7–6 
 6–9 
Draw 7:
 4–8 
 1–6 
 3–4 
 5–7 
Draw 8:
 8–4 
 5–4 
 4–6 
 4–7 
Standings after draw 8: Canada, Scotland 5–0, Norway 4–1, Denmark, Germany 3–2, China, Italy, USA, Switzerland 2–3, France, Sweden 1–4, Japan 0–5.

Cycling
UCI ProTour:
Tour of the Basque Country:
Stage 1:  Alejandro Valverde  3h 57' 58"  Christophe Le Mével  s.t.  Ryder Hesjedal  s.t.

Football (soccer)
2010 CAF Champions League First round, second leg: (first leg score in parentheses)
ASC Linguère  3–4 (0–1)  Djoliba. Djoliba win 5–3 on aggregate.

Weightlifting
European Championships in Minsk, Belarus:
Women's 48kg:
Snatch:  Nurcan Taylan  90 kg  Marzena Karpinska  83 kg  Genny Pagliaro  79 kg
Clean & Jerk:  Taylan 118 kg  Karpinska 96 kg  Şaziye Okur  95 kg
Total:  Taylan 208 kg (ER)  Karpinska 179 kg  Okur 173 kg
Men's 56kg:
Snatch:  Vitali Dzerbianiou  118 kg  Tom Goegebuer  116 kg  Iuri Dudolgo  115 kg
Clean & Jerk:  Smbat Margaryan  146 kg (EJR)  Sedat Artuç  139 kg  Goegebuer 138 kg
Total:  Dzerbianiou 256 kg  Margaryan 255 kg  Goegebuer 254 kg

April 4, 2010 (Sunday)

American Football
NFL:
The Philadelphia Eagles trade Donovan McNabb, the franchise's leader in career wins, pass attempts, pass completions, passing yards, and passing touchdowns, to the Washington Redskins for a second-round draft pick in this year's draft and either a third- or -fourth round pick in 2011.

Auto racing
Formula One:
Malaysian Grand Prix in Sepang, Malaysia:  Sebastian Vettel  (Red Bull–Renault) 1:33:48.412  Mark Webber  (Red Bull-Renault) +4.849  Nico Rosberg  (Mercedes)  +13.504
Drivers' standings (after 3 of 19 races): (1) Felipe Massa  (Ferrari) 39 points (2) Fernando Alonso (Ferrari) 37 (3) Vettel 37
Constructors' standings: (1) Ferrari 76 points (2) McLaren–Mercedes 66 (3) Red Bull-Renault 61

Baseball
MLB season opening game:
Boston Red Sox 9, New York Yankees 7

Basketball
NCAA Division I Women's Final Four in San Antonio (seeds with region in parentheses):
(Sacramento 1) Stanford 73, (Kansas City 3) Oklahoma 66
(Dayton 1) Connecticut 70, (Memphis 4) Baylor 50

Cricket
ICC Intercontinental Shield in Windhoek, day 2:
 214;  491/6 (Raymond van Schoor 157, Ewaid Steenkamp 206). Namibia lead by 277 runs with 4 wickets remaining in the 1st innings.

Curling
World Men's Championship in Cortina d'Ampezzo, Italy:
Draw 3:
 8–4 
 9–3 
Draw 4:
 7–5 
 5–6 
 8–6 
 8–3 
Draw 5:
 6–8 
 5–9 
 9–7 
 4–7 
Standings after draw 5: Canada, Scotland 3–0, Germany, China, Italy, Norway, Denmark 2–1, France, USA 1–2, Sweden, Switzerland, Japan 0–3.

Cycling
UCI ProTour:
Tour of Flanders:  Fabian Cancellara  6h 52' 32"  Tom Boonen  + 1' 14"  Philippe Gilbert  + 2' 10"

Football (soccer)
2010 CAF Champions League First round, second leg: (first leg score in parentheses)
Atlético Petróleos Luanda  1–0 (1–1)  Raja Casablanca. Atlético Petróleos Luanda win 2–1 on aggregate.
Dynamos  1–0 (1–0)  Saint Eloi Lupopo. Dynamos win 2–0 on aggregate.
TP Mazembe  2–0 (0–1)  APR. TP Mazembe win 2–1 on aggregate.
Heartland  1–1 (2–2)  Tiko United. 3–3 on aggregate, Heartland win on away goals rule.
ASEC Mimosas  1–1 (0–1)  Zanaco. Zanaco win 2–1 on aggregate.
Al-Hilal Omdurman  4–1 (0–0)  Africa Sports. Al-Hilal Omdurman win 4–1 on aggregate.
2010 CAF Confederation Cup First round, second leg: (first leg score in parentheses)
Costa do Sol  3–2 (2–4)  Amal. Amal win 6–5 on aggregate.
Enyimba  3–0 (0–2)  Académica Petróleo. Enyimba win 3–2 on aggregate.
Simba  2–1 (3–0)  Lengthens. Simba win 5–1 on aggregate.

Golf
Women's majors:
Kraft Nabisco Championship in Palm Springs, California, United States:
 Winner: Yani Tseng  275 (−13)
 Tseng wins her second major and third LPGA title in all.
PGA Tour:
Shell Houston Open in Humble, Texas:
 Winner: Anthony Kim  276 (−12)PO
 Kim wins on the fourth hole of a sudden-death playoff with countryman Vaughn Taylor to pick up his third PGA Tour title.

Snooker
China Open in Beijing, China:
Final: Mark Williams  def. Ding Junhui  10–6
Williams wins his 17th ranking title.

Tennis
ATP World Tour:
Sony Ericsson Open in Key Biscayne, United States:
Final: Andy Roddick  def. Tomáš Berdych  7–5, 6–4
Roddick wins his second title of the year and the 29th title of his career.

Volleyball
Women's CEV Champions League Final Four in Cannes, France:
Third place play-off:  RC Cannes  3–0  Asystel Novara
Final:  Fenerbahçe Acıbadem  2–3   Volley Bergamo
Bergamo win the title for the second straight year and seventh time overall.
Francesca Piccinini wins the MVP Award.

April 3, 2010 (Saturday)

Auto racing
Nationwide Series:
Nashville 300 in Gladeville, Tennessee:  Kevin Harvick (Chevrolet) (Kevin Harvick Incorporated)  Reed Sorenson (Toyota) (Braun Racing)  Kyle Busch (Toyota) (Joe Gibbs Racing)
Standings after 5 of 35 races: (1)  Carl Edwards (Ford) (Roush Fenway Racing) 820 points (2)  Brad Keselowski (Dodge) (Penske Championship Racing) 804 (3)  Justin Allgaier (Dodge) (Penske Championship Racing) 799
World Rally Championship:
Jordan Rally in Amman:  Sébastien Loeb /Daniel Elena  (Citroën C4 WRC) 3:51:35.9  Jari-Matti Latvala /Miikka Anttila  (Ford Focus RS WRC 09) +35.8  Petter Solberg /Phil Mills  (Citroën C4 WRC) +1:11.8
Drivers' standings (after 3 of 13 races): (1) Loeb 68 points (2) Latvala 43 (3) Mikko Hirvonen  (Ford Focus RS WRC 09) 37
Manufacturers' standings: (1) Citroën Total World Rally Team 101 points (2) BP Ford World Rally Team 87 (3) Citroën Junior Team 48

Basketball
NCAA Division I Men's Final Four in Indianapolis (seeds with region in parentheses):
(West 5) Butler 52, (Midwest 5) Michigan State 50
The Bulldogs advance to their first national championship game.
(South 1) Duke 78, (East 2) West Virginia 57
The Blue Devils reach the final for the first time since 2001 and the tenth time overall.
WNIT Final in Berkeley, California:
California 73, Miami (FL) 61

Cricket
ICC Intercontinental Shield in Windhoek, Namibia, day 1:
 214 (84.5 overs);  36/0 (9 overs).

Curling
World Men's Championship in Cortina d'Ampezzo, Italy:
Draw 1:
 1–5 
 4–5 
 6–7 
 4–5 
Draw 2:
 6–7 
 6–3 
 3–9 
 3–9 
Standings after draw 2: Germany 2–0, Scotland, Canada, Denmark, France 1–0, Italy, China 1–1, Switzerland, USA, Norway, Sweden 0–1, Japan 0–2.

Football (soccer)
2010 CAF Champions League First round, second leg: (first leg score in parentheses)
ASFA Yennega  1–3 (1–4)  Espérance ST. Espérance ST win 7–2 on aggregate.
US Stade Tamponnaise  1–0 (1–3)  Ismaily. Ismaily win 3–2 on aggregate.
Al-Merreikh  2–0 (1–1)  Gazelle FC. Al-Merreikh win 3–1 on aggregate.
Ferroviário Maputo  2–0 (0–3)  Supersport United. Supersport United win 3–2 on aggregate.
2010 CAF Confederation Cup First round, second leg: (first leg score in parentheses)
ZESCO United  2–0 (0–3)  Warri Wolves. Warri Wolves win 3–2 on aggregate.
FAR Rabat  1–1 (0–1)  CR Belouizdad. CR Belouizdad win 2–1 on aggregate.
Moroka Swallows   0–1 (1–1)  CAPS United. CAPS United win 2–1 on aggregate.
AS Vita Club  3–2 (1–1)  Panthère de Ndé. AS Vita Club win 4–3 on aggregate.
Primeiro de Agosto  3–0 (0–0)  CO Bamako. Primeiro de Agosto win 3–0 on aggregate.
Haras El Hodood  5–0 (1–1)  Banks. Haras El Hodood win 6–1 on aggregate.
FC 105  0–1 (0–0)  DC Motema Pembe.DC Motema Pembe win 1–0 on aggregate.
Stade Malien  2–0 (0–2)  Séwé Sport. 2–2 on aggregate, Stade Malien win 4–3 in penalty shootout.
Cotonsport  2–0 (1–3)  AC Léopard. 3–3 on aggregate, Cotonsport win on away goals rule.

Rowing
156th University Boat Race on the River Thames, London: ( unless stated)
Cambridge University Boat Club (Rob Weitemeyer , Henry Pelly, Fred Gill, Code Sternal , Deaglan McEachern , Peter McCelland , George Nash, Derek Rasmussen , Ted Randolph) beat Oxford University Boat Club (Ben Myers, Martin Walsh , Tyler Winklevoss , Cameron Winklevoss , Sjoerd Hamburger , Matt Evans , Simon Gawlick , Charlie Burkitt, Adam Barhamand ) by 1½ lengths.
Cambridge extend their overall lead to 80 against 75, with one dead heat.

Tennis
WTA Tour:
Sony Ericsson Open in Key Biscayne, United States:
Final: Kim Clijsters  def. Venus Williams  6–2, 6–1
Clijsters wins her second title of the year and 37th of her career. It's her second title of this event, also winning in 2005.

Volleyball
Women's CEV Champions League Final Four in Cannes, France:
Semifinals:
Fenerbahçe Acıbadem  3–2  RC Cannes
Asystel Novara  1–3  Volley Bergamo

April 2, 2010 (Friday)

Football (soccer)
2010 CAF Champions League First round, second leg: (first leg score in parentheses)
Gaborone United  3–0 (3–0)  Curepipe Starlight. Gaborone United win 6–0 on aggregate.
JS Kabylie  1–0 (1–1)  Club Africain. JS Kabylie win 2–1 on aggregate.
Difaa El Jadida  1–1 (1–1)  Ittihad. 2–2 on aggregate (AET); Ittihad win 4–3 on penalties.
ES Sétif  5–0 (2–0)  Union Douala. ES Sétif win 7–0 on aggregate.
Al-Ahly  2–0 (0–1)  Gunners. Al Ahly win 2–1 on aggregate.
2010 CAF Confederation Cup First round, second leg: (first leg score in parentheses)
Khartoum  1–2 (0–3)  Petrojet. Petrojet win 5–1 on aggregate.
CS Sfaxien  1–0 (0–0)  Ahly Tripoli. CS Sfaxien win 1–0 on aggregate.
Étoile Sahel  2–1 (0–1)  ASFAN. 2–2 on aggregate; ASFAN win on away goals.
FUS Rabat  1–0 (0–0)  Baraka. FUS Rabat win 1–0 on aggregate.

April 1, 2010 (Thursday)

Basketball
Euroleague Quarterfinals, game 4:
Real Madrid  78–84  Regal FC Barcelona. Barcelona win the series 3–1.
Partizan Belgrade  76–67  Maccabi Tel Aviv. Partizan win the series 3–1.
Caja Laboral Baskonia  70–74  CSKA Moscow. CSKA win the series 3–1.
Asseco Prokom Gdynia  70–86  Olympiacos Piraeus. Olympiacos win the series 3–1.
EuroCup Women Final, first leg:
Nadezhda  57–65  Sony Athinaikos
NIT Final in New York City:
Dayton 79, North Carolina 68
WNIT Semifinal in Normal, Illinois:
California 61, Illinois State 45

Darts
Premier League round 8 in Cardiff, Wales:
Terry Jenkins  2–8 Mervyn King 
Simon Whitlock  5–8 Ronnie Baxter 
Adrian Lewis  8–5 James Wade 
Phil Taylor  8–2 Raymond van Barneveld 
High Checkout: Ronnie Baxter 124
Standings (after 8 matches): Taylor 15 points, King, Baxter 10, Lewis, Whitlock 7, Wade 6, van Barneveld 5, Jenkins 4.

Football (soccer)
2011 FIFA Women's World Cup qualification (UEFA):
Group 2:  0–1 
Standings: Norway 12 points (4 matches), Netherlands 10 (5), Belarus 4 (3), Slovakia 3 (4), Macedonia 0 (4)
Group 3:
 8–1 
 0–7 
Standings: Denmark 13 points (5 matches), Scotland 12 (4), Greece 6 (4), Bulgaria 4 (5), Georgia 0 (6).
Group 5:  1–0 
Standings: England 12 points (4 matches), Spain 12 (5), Turkey 6 (4), Austria 3 (4), Malta 0 (5).
Group 8:  0–3 
Standings: Sweden 12 points (4 matches), Czech Republic 9 (5), Belgium 7 (7), Wales 6 (6), Azerbaijan 4 (4).
UEFA Europa League Quarter-finals, first leg:
Fulham  2–1  Wolfsburg
Hamburg  2–1  Standard Liège
Valencia  2–2  Atlético Madrid
Benfica  2–1  Liverpool
Copa Libertadores: (teams in bold advance to the round of 16, teams in strike are eliminated)
Group 1: Corinthians  2–1  Cerro Porteño
Standings (after 4 matches): Corinthians 10 points, Racing 7, Independiente Medellín 3, Cerro Porteño 1.
Group 2: Once Caldas  1–0  Nacional
Standings (after 5 matches): Once Caldas 11 points, São Paulo 10, Monterrey 6, Nacional 0.
Group 5: Emelec  0–1  Deportivo Quito
Standings (after 4 matches): Internacional 8 points, Cerro 7, Deportivo Quito 7, Emelec 0.

References

IV